= Matthew Johnson =

Matthew or Matt Johnson may refer to:

== Film and television ==
- Matt Johnson (director) (born 1985), Canadian writer, director, actor, editor and producer
- Matt Johnson (TV presenter) (born 1982), Welsh television presenter
- Matt Johnson, protagonist played by Jan-Michael Vincent in the 1978 surfing movie Big Wednesday
- Matt Johnson, writer of the film Torque

== Music ==
- Matt Johnson (singer) (born 1961), British singer for the band The The
- Matt Johnson, former lead vocalist for metalcore band, Architects.
- Matt Johnson (keyboardist) (born 1969), British keyboardist for the funk band Jamiroquai
- Matt Johnson (drummer) (born 1970), American drummer for Jeff Buckley
- Matt Johnson (country singer) (born 1996), American country singer from Dallas, Texas
- Matt Johnson (One True Voice), British singer, member of the group One True Voice
- Matt Johnson, guitarist in the band The Autumn Offering
- Matt Johnson, bassist for the band Chainsaw Kittens
- Matt Johnson, drummer for the band Fat Tulips
- Matt Johnson, keyboardist for the band Matt and Kim
- Matthew Johnson, co-founder of Fat Possum Records

== Sports ==
- Matt Johnson (Australian footballer) (born 1959), Australian rules footballer for Footscray
- Matthew Johnson (Australian footballer) (born 2003), Australian rules footballer for Fremantle
- Matt Johnson (basketball) (born circa 1969), American basketball player
- Matt Johnson (English footballer) (1910–1988), English footballer
- Matt Johnson (ice hockey) (born 1975), Canadian ice hockey player
- Matt Johnson (safety) (born 1989), American football player
- Matt Johnson (quarterback) (born 1992), American football quarterback
- Matthew Johnson (rugby union) (born 1994), New Zealand rugby union player

== Others ==
- Matthew Johnson, teenager shot and killed by an SFPD officer to start the Hunters Point Social Uprising (1966)
- Matt Johnson (North Dakota politician) (1871–1935), newspaper publisher and Republican politician from North Dakota
- Matthew Johnson (judge) (born 1963), Minnesota Court of Appeals judge
- Matthew Steven Johnson (born 1963), American serial killer and rapist
- Matthew S. Johnson (born 1966), professor of chemistry at Copenhagen University
- Matt Johnson (artist) (born 1978), sculptor in Los Angeles
- Matthew Johnson (plant biologist)
- Matthew Charles Johnson (born 1973), Australian convicted murderer

== See also ==
- Mat Johnson (born 1970), American writer
- List of people with surname Johnson
