= Peter Karl Sorger =

American cancer biologist (born 1961)

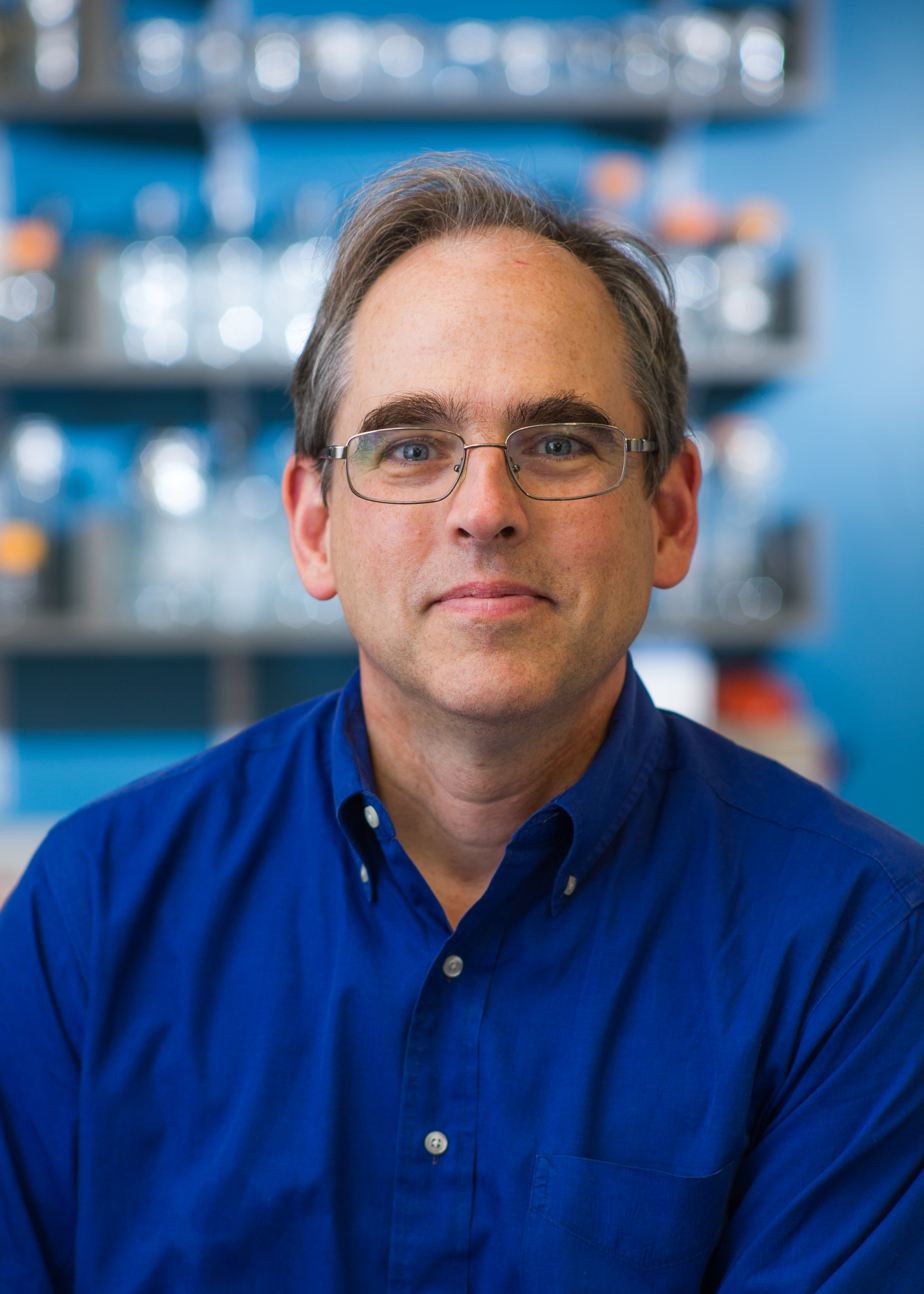
- Sorger in 2014
- Born: 1961 (age 64–65); Halifax Nova Scotia, Canada
- Title: Otto Krayer Professor of Systems Pharmacology, Harvard Medical School
- Spouse: Caroline Shamu
- Awards: Marshall Scholar; Searle Scholar

Academic background
- Education: Harvard College (AB); Trinity College, Cambridge (PhD); University of California, San Francisco (Postdoc)
- Thesis: The transcriptional regulation of heat shock genes (1988)
- Doctoral advisor: Hugh Pelham
- Other advisors: Stephen C. Harrison; Harold E. Varmus; Andrew Murray

Academic work
- Discipline: Biochemistry; Cancer systems biology; Systems pharmacology
- Institutions: European Molecular Biology Laboratory; Massachusetts Institute of Technology; Harvard Medical School; MRC Laboratory of Molecular Biology

Peter Karl Sorger (born February 13, 1961, in Halifax Nova Scotia, Canada) is a systems and cancer biologist and Otto Krayer Professor of Systems Pharmacology in the Department of Systems Biology at Harvard Medical School. Sorger is the founding head of the Harvard Program in Therapeutic Science (HiTS), director of its Laboratory of Systems Pharmacology (LSP), and co-director of the Harvard MIT Center for Regulatory Science. He was previously a professor of Biology and Biological Engineering at the Massachusetts Institute of Technology where he co-founded its program on Computational and Systems Biology (CSBi). Sorger is known for his work in the field of systems biology and for having helped launch the field of computational and systems pharmacology. His research focuses on the molecular origins of cancer and approaches to accelerate the development of new medicines. Sorger teaches Principles and Practice of Drug Development at Massachusetts Institute of Technology and Harvard University.

== Early life ==
Sorger was born on February 13, 1961, in Halifax Nova Scotia, Canada to Scottish and Austrian parents. His family immigrated to the US in 1963. He graduated summa cum laude from Harvard College in 1983 (in Biochemistry) where he studied the assembly of icosahedral viruses under the supervision of Stephen C. Harrison. He received his PhD for Biochemistry as a Marshall Scholar from Trinity College, Cambridge for research on the transcriptional regulation of heat shock genes under the supervision of Hugh Pelham at the Medical Research Council Laboratory of Molecular Biology in Cambridge, England. He then trained as a Richard Childs Fellow and Lucille P. Markey Scholar with Harold Varmus and Andrew Murray at the University of California, San Francisco.

== Career ==
Sorger joined the MIT Department of Biology in 1994 following a year as a visiting scientist with Anthony A. Hyman at the European Molecular Biology Laboratory, Heidelberg, Germany. Sorger became a full Professor in the MIT Biology and Biological Engineering Departments in 2004.

Sorger's postdoctoral and early faculty research led to the first reconstitution of a chromosome-microtubule attachment (a yeast kinetochore) and the subsequent identification of multiple kinetochore proteins. His group identified mammalian homologs of the checkpoint proteins that regulate entry into mitosis, and showed that mutations in these genes can be oncogenic because they cause chromosome instability. This work contributed to the understanding of the faithful transmission of chromosomes from mother to daughter cells. Defects in these mechanisms cause aneuploidy that plays a major role in oncogenic transformation.

Working closely with Doug Lauffenburger and funded by the Defense Advanced Research Projects Agency and the National Institutes of Health's National Centers for Systems Biology program, Sorger's work in the 1990s increasingly focused on oncogenesis itself and on mammalian signal transduction. Sorger and Lauffenburger's approach combined molecular genetics, live-cell microscopy and mechanistic computational modeling. Their focus on biochemistry REF was unusual in an era dominated by genomics and ultimately led Sorger to co-found the software company Glencoe Software and the biotech company Merrimack Pharmaceuticals. Subsequent work by Sorger' group led to a new understanding of stochastic fluctuation in cellular responses to natural ligands and drugs and to the development of a range of innovative computational methods, including the biochemistry-specific Python PySB and the natural language processing and knowledge assembly system INDRA.

In 2011, Sorger was active in the development of the discipline of Quantitative Systems Pharmacology, including overseeing the preparation of a widely cited white paper for the NIH entitled "Quantitative and Systems Pharmacology in the Post-genomic Era: New Approaches to Discovering Drugs and Understanding Therapeutic Mechanisms". This white paper envisioned the emergence of an empirically based but computationally sophisticated approach to the science underlying development of innovative new medicines. Sorger moved to Harvard Medical School to pursue these approaches by establishing the Laboratory of Systems Pharmacology, which merges laboratory experiments, computer science, and medicine to fundamentally improve drug discovery. Funding from the Massachusetts Life Sciences Center in 2014 and 2017 made the lab a reality and it now has 150 faculty trainees and staff from Boston-area institutions including Harvard University, MIT, Tufts University, Northeastern University and Harvard-affiliated Hospitals.

Sorger's research involves multiple systems pharmacology approaches to cancer. The first focuses on preclinical pharmacology, the stage at which the molecular mechanisms of disease are studied and new drugs sought. An investigation into the causes of irreproducibility drug-response measurements led to a series of conceptual, computational, and experimental improvements in scoring drug action that are now widely used in academe and industry and have enabled the discovery of new mechanisms of action for existing drugs. Recent work has focused on deep learning as means to further understand complex protein networks and drug mechanisms. The second project involves developing methods to study drug mechanism at scale in patients through highly multiplexed tissue imaging of the biopsies routinely acquired from patients (particularly cancer patients). This has led to a very rapidly growing tissue imaging and digital histology program that is part of the US National Cancer Institute Moonshot and promises to substantially advance precision cancer care. The third project involves studying the clinical trial record to understand how successful and failed trials differ. An early success was the discovery that the great majority of approved combination cancer therapies exhibit independent action – not synergy. As Merck & Co. investigators subsequently realized, this fundamentally changes how immunotherapy combinations should be developed. The group is now engaged in a large-scale effort to digitize and make freely available all survival data from Phase 3 clinical trials.

== COVID-19 pandemic research ==
During the early COVID-19 pandemic, Sorger, physician Nicole LeBoeuf, and MD–PhD student Deborah Plana established the Boston Area Pandemic Fabrication team (PanFab) in response to shortages of face masks, respirators, and other personal protective equipment for healthcare workers. The team consisted of students and alumni from the MIT and Harvard University and worked with local industry partners on 3D printing and rapid-manufacturing projects. These projects included the development of face shields, mask frames, powered air purifying respirators, and methods for sterilizing and reusing N95 respirators. The PanFab group produced multiple open-access publications and publicly released design files documenting this work, including a summary of outcomes and lessons learned.
