= Eric Oldfield =

Eric Oldfield may refer to:

- Eric Oldfield (actor), Australian actor, musician and former model
- Eric Oldfield (academic) (born 1948), British chemist
