= Judith Berman (geneticist) =

American molecular geneticist

Academic background
- Education: BSc, Plant Pathology, Cornell University; PhD, Biochemistry, 1985, Weizmann Institute of Science

Academic work
- Institutions: Shmunis School of Biomedical and Cancer Research; University of Minnesota
- Main interests: Model and pathogenic yeasts
- Website: www.jbermanlab.com

Judith Gabriella Berman is an American scientist, a member of the National Academy of Sciences, and a professor of genetics and microbiology at Tel Aviv University. She holds the Nathan Galston Chair in Antimicrobial Drug Research at the university's Shmunis School of Biomedicine and Cancer Research and is a professor emerita at the University of Minnesota. Her research focuses on fungal genome stability and responses to antifungal drugs, including how changes in chromosome number and genome organization contribute to adaptation in yeasts, particularly Candida albicans. She is also an elected member of the American Academy of Arts and Sciences.

== Education ==
Berman received a Bachelor of Science degree in plant pathology from Cornell University in 1979. She completed a PhD in biochemistry at the Weizmann Institute of Science in 1984 under the supervision of Ada Zamir. From 1984 to 1986, she was a postdoctoral fellow in molecular biology and genetics at Cornell, working with Bik Kwoon Tye.

== Career ==
Berman joined the Department of Plant Biology at the University of Minnesota as an assistant professor in 1986 and was promoted to full professor of genetics and cell biology in 2000. She held an adjunct appointment in microbiology from 1999 to 2012 and was a visiting scientist in molecular genetics at the Weizmann Institute of Science in 2004. In 2008, she was named a Distinguished McKnight University Professor at the University of Minnesota.

In 2012, Berman moved her laboratory to Tel Aviv University and joined its George S. Wise Faculty of Life Sciences as a full professor. She retained a research professorship at the University of Minnesota from 2012 to 2015 and became professor emerita there in 2015. At Tel Aviv University, she directed the Joan and Jaime Constantiner Institute for Molecular Genetics from 2017 to 2023 and became director of the Strauss Family Genomics Research Unit in 2018. She was appointed to the Nathan Galston Chair in Antimicrobial Drug Research in 2020.

In 2023, she was appointed an honorary professor at the Medical Research Council Centre for Medical Mycology at the University of Exeter.

== Research ==
Berman's research focuses on genome stability, fungal cell biology and responses to antifungal drugs. She has examined the organization, inheritance and variability of fungal genomes. Her earlier work investigated telomeres, the structures at the ends of chromosomes, including telomere-binding proteins in yeast and the relationship between chromatin assembly and gene silencing. She has also studied centromeres, kinetochores and the mechanisms governing chromosome segregation during cell division.

Her research on Candida albicans has addressed aneuploidy, in which cells gain or lose individual chromosomes; ploidy, the number of complete chromosome sets; and loss of heterozygosity. These studies have examined how genomic changes generate variation within fungal populations and influence adaptation to environmental conditions. In 2013, she co-authored a study showing that C. albicans, previously considered an obligate diploid, can form mating-competent haploid cells. Other collaborative studies have examined its parasexual cycle and the production of genetically diverse descendants through changes in chromosome number.

Berman has also investigated the relationship between the cell cycle and fungal morphogenesis, including the growth of C. albicans as yeast cells and hyphae. Her collaborative work has included genome annotation, comparative studies of pathogenicity and reproduction among Candida species, and the development of genetic tools for studying protein function and gene essentiality.

Another area of Berman's research concerns antifungal drug resistance and tolerance. Her collaborative studies have examined how fungal cells adapt to antifungal drugs through genetic and physiological changes, including the association between aneuploidy and drug resistance in C. albicans. This work has included research on the formation of isochromosomes that increase the copy number of genes involved in drug responses, as well as how adaptation to one drug can alter responses to other drugs.

Berman has distinguished antifungal tolerance from resistance by examining variations in drug responses among individual cells within a population. This research has explored the association between tolerance and persistent Candida bloodstream infections, together with the effects of metabolism and interactions among microorganisms on drug responses. She has also studied drug responses in Candida glabrata, Candida auris and Cryptococcus neoformans, as well as combinations of antifungal drugs.

At Tel Aviv University, Berman's research received support through a European Research Council Advanced Grant for the RAPLODAPT project, covering 2014–2018, and a Synergy Grant for the FungalTolerance project, covering 2021–2028. The latter project, a collaboration with Markus Ralser and his team at Charité's Institute of Biochemistry, investigates the mechanisms by which invasive fungal pathogens survive exposure to antifungal drugs across multiple levels of biological organization.

== Honors and awards ==
- 1994 – Career Advancement Award for Women, National Science Foundation.
- 2007 – Elected a fellow of the American Association for the Advancement of Science and the American Academy of Microbiology.
- 2008 – Distinguished McKnight University Professor, University of Minnesota.
- 2019 – Elected member of the European Molecular Biology Organization.
- 2023 – Foundation Lecturer, British Society for Medical Mycology; postponed from 2022.
- 2025 – Rhoda Benham Award in Medical Mycology, Medical Mycological Society of the Americas.
- 2026 – Elected member of the National Academy of Sciences.
- 2026 – Elected member of the American Academy of Arts and Sciences.

== Personal life ==
Berman and her husband Mike have two children together. In Twin Cities, they were involved in the local Jewish community; their sons attended the Minneapolis Jewish Day School, and the Bermans both served on the boards of local Jewish organizations.
