= Anthony Spencer =

Anthony Spencer may refer to:

- Anthony Spencer (American football) (born 1984), American football player
- Anthony James Merrill Spencer (1929–2008), British mathematician
- Anthony Mark Spencer, Australian outlaw biker and gangster
- Tony Spencer (born 1965), British football player
