= D. Lansing Taylor =

American biologist

D. Lansing (Lans) Taylor
- Education: University of Maryland (BS); University at Albany, SUNY (PhD)
- Awards: Received Society for Biomolecular Sciences (SBS) Accomplishment Award (2007)
- Scientific career
- Workplaces: University of Pittsburgh
- Website: www.researchgate.net/profile/D_Taylor5

D. Lansing Taylor is the Director at the University of Pittsburgh Drug Discovery Institute (UPDDI), Pennsylvania and a faculty member in the Department of Computational and Systems Biology.

== Early life and education ==
Lansing Taylor was born in Baltimore, Maryland. He received his B.S. in zoology from the University of Maryland, followed by his Ph.D. in the field of cell biology from the State University of New York at Albany. He spent a postdoctoral fellowship at the Marine Biological Laboratory (MBL) in Woods Hole in the field of cellular biophysics.

== Research and career ==
Lansing Taylor originally did research on the cellular and molecular mechanisms of Amoeboid movements at Harvard University as an assistant and associate professor. He moved to Carnegie Mellon University (CMU) as a professor to direct the Center for Fluorescence Research where he led the program to develop fluorescence-based biosensors of cellular physiology and light microscope imaging systems for various applications in basic biomedical research. During this time he co-founded Biological Detection Systems to commercialize fluorescence-based reagents and research imaging platforms, later purchased by Amersham, now GE Life Sciences. Lans left CMU to found Cellomics and created High Content Screening (HCS) for large-scale phenotypic screening for drug discovery and development which later became part of ThermoFisher. Cellumen was the next company founded by Lans to apply systems cell biology to both drug safety testing (now part of Cyprotex) and cancer diagnostics. The cancer diagnostics unit was spun off as Cernostics and they created a test for Barrett's Esophagus. He returned to academia as the Director of the UPDDI. His current research interests include the development and application of human microphysiology systems as more advanced experimental models for drug discovery and development, the application of quantitative systems pharmacology (QSP) for a new paradigm in drug discovery and computational and systems pathology to predict therapeutic strategies for a variety of diseases. He is the co-founder and Chairman of SpIntellx, a computational and systems pathology company with focus on spatial analytics and explainable AI (xAI).

== Awards and honors ==
D. Lansing Taylor received the Society for Biomolecular Sciences (SBS) Accomplishment Award for the development of High-Content Screening (HCS). His additional awards include the Smithsonian Award for developing live cell imaging technologies and the Mack Fulwyler Award from the International Society for Advancement of Cytometry (ISAC) for outstanding contributions to the field of cytometry. Lans is a Fellow of the American Institute for Medical and Biomedical Engineering. Honors include receiving the National Science Foundation Pioneer Award for recognition of the vision, leadership and entrepreneurial spirit for the Science and Technology Centers and the Ernst & Young Entrepreneur of the Year in Pennsylvania for Cellomics.

== Grants ==
- D. Lansing Taylor research on Human Microphysiology Systems Disease Model of Type 2 Diabetes Starting with Liver and pancreatic Islets was funded by the National Institute of Health (NIH) agency and the project started on 20 September 2018 and it will end on 31 July 2023.
- D. Lansing Taylor research on Harnessing human brain and liver microphysiological systems for testing therapeutics for metastatic melanoma was funded by the National Institute of Health (NIH) agency and the project started on 1 August 2018 and it will end on 31 July 2023.
- D. Lansing Taylor research on Applying a Human Liver Microphysiology System to Develop Therapeutic Strategies for Non-Alcoholic Fatty Liver Disease (NAFLD) was funded by the National Institute of Health (NIH) agency and the project started on 1 August 2018 and it will end on 30 April 2022.

== Patents ==
Dr. Taylor has obtained more than 29 patents for his inventions. His patents include;

- Standing wave luminescence microscopy, (1986).
- System for Cell-based screening, (1999).
- Field synthesis and optical subsectioning for standing wave microscopy, (2000).
- Miniaturized cell array methods and apparatus for cell-based screening, (2000).
- Method for automated tissue analysis, (2012).
