= List of fellows of the Royal Society elected in 1987 =

This is a list of fellows of the Royal Society elected in 1987.

== Fellows ==
- Robert McNeill Alexander
- George Brownlee
- Bruce Macintosh Cattanach
- John Frederick Clarke (1927–2013)
- William Compston
- Donald Watts Davies (1924–2000)
- Peter Charles Doherty
- Duncan Dowson
- John William Fozard (1928–1996)
- Coluthur Gopalan
- Peter Raymond Grant
- James Alexander Green
- Norman Neill Greenwood (1949–2012)
- Bryan Desmond Harrison
- Michael Patrick Hassell
- Anthony Rex Hunter
- Herbert Eric Huppert
- Olga Kennard (1924–2023)
- Anthony John Kirby
- William Graeme Laver (1929–2008)
- Rodney Loudon
- Nicholas John Mackintosh
- Sir Peter Mansfield
- Terence Arthur Mansfield
- James Desmond Caldwell McConnell (1930–2026)
- Peter Hague Nye (1921–2009)
- David Ian Olive (1937–2012)
- Oliver Penrose
- John Douglas Pettigrew
- Terence Howard Rabbitts
- Benton Seymour Rabinovitch
- Edward Peter Raynes
- Peter Neville Robson (1930–2010)
- Sir Michael Llewellyn Rutter (1933–2021)
- Roman Mieczyslaw Sawicki (1930–1990)
- Anthony James Merrill Spencer (1929–2008)
- Patrick Christopher Steptoe (1913–1988)
- William Thomas Tutte (1917–2002)
- James Kay Graham Watson
- Sir Martin Francis Wood

== Foreign members ==
- David Baltimore (1938–2025)
- Norman Ernest Borlaug (1914–2009)
- Walter Gilbert
- Vitaly Lazarevich Ginzburg (1916–2009)
- George Rankine Irwin (1907–1998)
- Rudolph Arthur Marcus (1923–2026)

== Other ==
- Sir Peter Markham Scott (1909–1989) (elected under statute 12)
- Anne Elizabeth Alice Louise Princess Royal (elected a Royal Fellow)
