= Colworth Medal =

British biochemistry research award

- Awarded for: outstanding research by a young biochemist of any nationality who has carried out the majority of their work in the UK or Republic of Ireland
- Sponsored by: Biochemical Society
- Reward: £3000
- Website: www.biochemistry.org/grants-and-awards/awards/awards-listing/the-colworth-medal/

The Colworth Medal is awarded annually by the Biochemical Society to an outstanding research biochemist under the age of 35 and working mainly in the United Kingdom. The award is one of the most prestigious recognitions for young scientists in the UK, and was established by Tony James FRS at Unilever Research and Henry Arnstein of the Biochemical Society and takes its name from a Unilever research laboratory near Bedford in the UK, Colworth House.

The medal was first presented in 1963 and many of those receiving the award are recognised as outstanding scientists achieving international reputations. The lecture is published in Biochemical Society Transactions, previously Colworth Medal lectures were published in The Biochemical Journal.

== Laureates ==
- 2027: Tom Deegan
- 2026: Benjamin Ryskeldi-Falcon
- 2025: Alexander Borodavka
- 2024: Kelly Nguyen
- 2023: Stephen Wallace
- 2022: Tanmay A. M. Bharat
- 2021: Giulia Zanetti
- 2020: Stephan Uphoff
- 2019: Melina Schuh
- 2018: Matthew Johnson
- 2017: Markus Ralser
- 2016: David Grainger
- 2015: Helen Walden
- 2014: M. Madan Babu
- 2013: Robin C. May
- 2012: Akhilesh Reddy
- 2011: Sarah Teichmann
- 2010: Mark S. Dillingham
- 2009: Giles E. Hardingham
- 2008: John Rouse
- 2007: Frank Sargent
- 2006: Simon J. Boulton
- 2005: Ian Collinson
- 2004: James H. Naismith
- 2003: David J. Owen
- 2002: Thomas Owen-Hughes
- 2001: Andrew D. Sharrocks
- 2000: Dario Alessi
- 1999: Nigel Scrutton
- 1998: David Barford
- 1997: Stephen P. Jackson
- 1996: Sheena Radford
- 1995: Jonathon Pines
- 1994: R. L. Stephens
- 1993: Nicholas Tonks
- 1992: Angus I. Lamond
- 1991: Michael A. J. Ferguson
- 1990: David W. Melton
- 1988: Hugh Pelham
- 1987: C. Peter Downes
- 1986: Greg Winter
- 1985: Alec Jeffreys
- 1984: Miles D. Houslay
- 1983: Eric Oldfield
- 1982: David M. J. Lilley
- 1981: Terence H. Rabbitts
- 1980: Richard A. Flavell
- 1979: Ronald Laskey
- 1978: Timothy E. Hardingham
- 1977: Philip Cohen
- 1976: George Brownlee
- 1975: William J. Brammar
- 1974: David R. Trentham
- 1973: James C. Metcalfe
- 1972: John M. Ashworth
- 1971: A. R. Williamson
- 1970: Dai Rees
- 1969: George Radda
- 1968: Peter B. Garland
- 1967: L. J. Morris
- 1966: Mark Henry Richmond
- 1965: J. Brian Chappell
- 1964: Jamshed R. Tata
- 1963: Hans Kornberg

== See also ==
- List of biochemistry awards
