= George Brownlee =

British pathologist

- Born: George Gow Brownlee; 13 January 1942 (age 84)
- Education: University of Cambridge (MA, PhD)
- Spouse: Margaret Susan Kemp (m. 1966)
- Awards: Colworth Medal (1976); EMBO Member (1979); FRS (1987); FMedSci (1998)
- Scientific career
- Fields: Pathology
- Workplaces: University of Cambridge; University of Oxford; Laboratory of Molecular Biology; Sir William Dunn School of Pathology
- Thesis: Nucleotide sequences in the low molecular weight ribosomal ribonucleic acid of Escherichia coli (1967)
- Doctoral advisor: Frederick Sanger
- Doctoral students: Greg Winter
- Website: linc.ox.ac.uk/Fellows/GeorgeBrownlee

George Gow Brownlee is a British pathologist and Fellow of Lincoln College, Oxford.

== Education ==
Brownlee was educated at Dulwich College and Emmanuel College, Cambridge where he studied Natural Sciences and was awarded a Master of Arts degree followed by PhD in 1967 for research on nucleotides supervised by Fred Sanger at the MRC Laboratory of Molecular Biology (LMB).

== Career and Research ==
Brownlee was Professor of Chemical Pathology at Sir William Dunn School of Pathology, from 1978 to 2008.

Brownlee cloned and expressed human clotting factor IX, providing a recombinant source of this protein for Haemophilia B patients who had previously relied on the hazardous blood-derived product.

With Merlin Crossley he helped discover the two sets of genetic mutations that were preventing two key proteins from attaching to the DNA of people with a rare and unusual form of Haemophilia B – Haemophilia B Leyden – where sufferers experience episodes of excessive bleeding in childhood but have few bleeding problems after puberty. This lack of protein attachment to the DNA was thereby turning off the gene that produces clotting factor IX, which prevents excessive bleeding.

With Peter Palese and co-workers he developed the first reverse genetics system for influenza virus, markedly speeding up the process of developing influenza vaccines.

Brownlee authored a biography of Fred Sanger published in 2014.

== Awards and honours ==
Brownlee was awarded The Colworth Medal by the Biochemical Society in 1976 and elected a Fellow of the Royal Society (FRS) in 1987. His certificate of election and candidature reads:

Distinguished for his work on the sequences of nucleic acids and their biological implications. He contributed to the development of methods using 32P-labelling and two-dimensional fractionation techniques, which greatly accelerated the early RNA sequencing. He used these methods to determine the sequence of the 5S ribosomal RNA, at that time the largest nucleic acid to be sequenced. He used fingerprint analysis of messenger RNA to demonstrate that immunoglobulin V- and C-regions were not discontinuous at the messenger RNA level, and early analysis of messenger RNA to identify a precursor for light chain synthesis. Parallel studies on globin messenger RNA demonstrated important features of eucaryotic translation. More recently he has developed faster methods for RNA sequencing and has applied them to transfer RNAs and ovalbumin messenger RNA. He also studied the DNA sequence of the ovalbumin gene and its insertion sequences. He determined the nucleotide sequence of the multiple gene coding for the 5S RNA in Xenopus laevis and showed that the coding regions alternated with a repetitious region and a "pseudogene" that had a sequence homologous with part of the 5S region.

Brownlee was also elected a Fellow of the Academy of Medical Sciences (FMedSci) in 1998 and an EMBO Member in 1979.

== See also ==
- Pseudogene (database)
