= Prisca Liberali =

Italian chemist

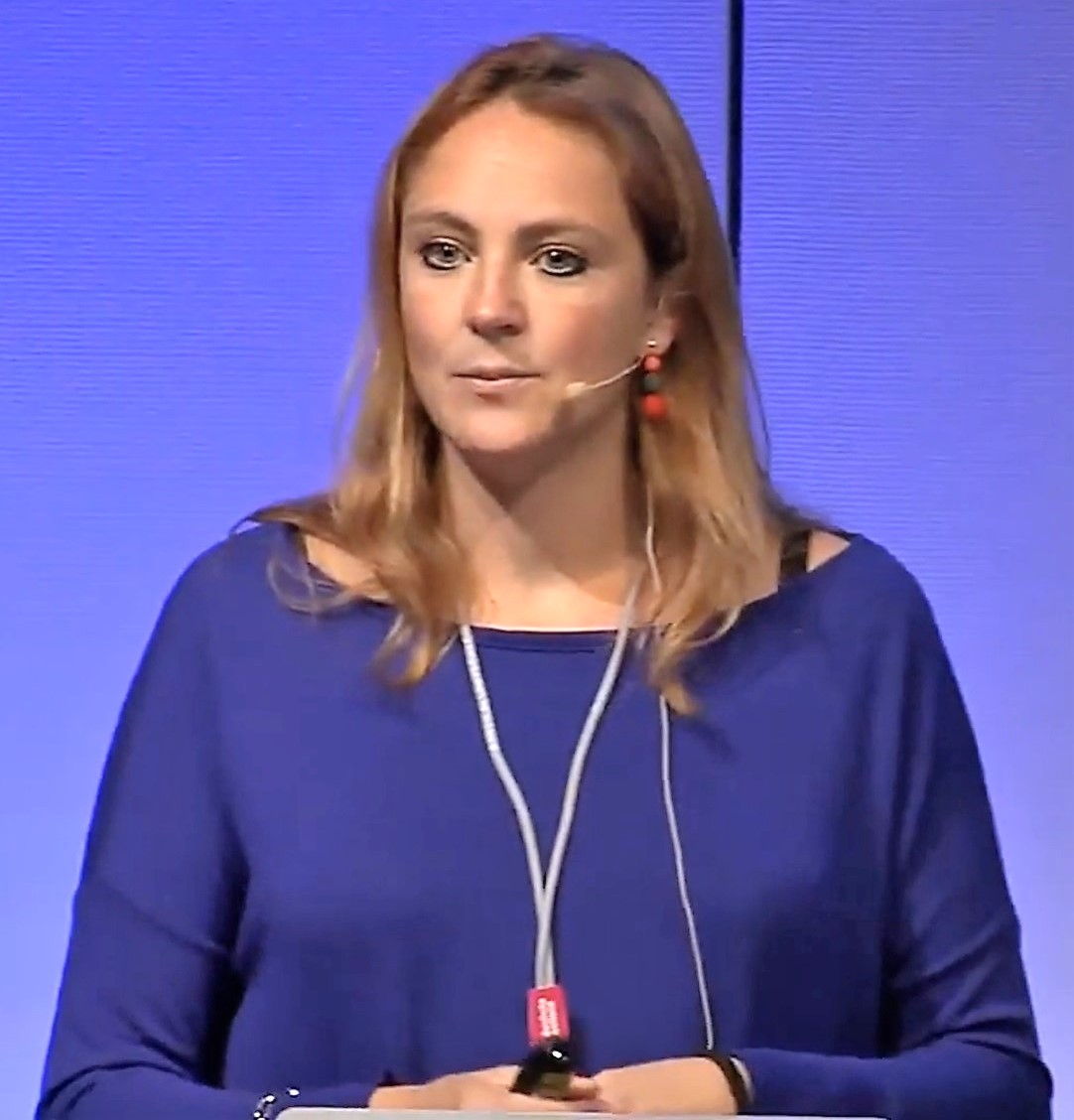
- Liberali presents at the Human Cell Atlas Computational Methods meeting in 2017
- Born: Belgium
- Education: Mario Negri Institute for Pharmacological Research; Sapienza University of Rome; Open University (PhD)
- Awards: EMBO Gold Medal (2022); EMBO Member (2022)
- Scientific career
- Workplaces: Friedrich Miescher Institute for Biomedical Research; ETH Zurich; University of Basel
- Thesis: Mechanisms regulating the dual function of CtBP3/BARS in mammal cell membrane fission and transcription (2008)
- Website: liberalilab.org

Prisca Liberali is an Italian chemist who is a senior group leader at the Friedrich Miescher Institute for Biomedical Research and Professor at ETH Zurich at the Department of Biological System and Engineering. Her research takes a systems biology approach to understand the behaviour of multi-cellular systems. She was awarded the EMBO Gold Medal and EMBO Membership in 2022.

== Early life and education ==
Liberali was born in Belgium, and grew up between Belgium and Luxembourg. Her parents worked for the European Union. She attended the Sapienza University of Rome, where she studied physical organic chemistry. She moved to the Mario Negri Institute for Pharmacological Research, where she worked toward a doctorate in cell biology with Daniela Corda. Her doctorate looked at the mechanisms that regulate the function of the carboxy-terminal binding protein 3/brefeldin A-ribosylated substrate (CtBP3/BARS) in the membrane fission of mammal cells and was awarded by the Open University. Her PhD used high-contrast screening and mapping of genetics interactions.

== Research and career ==
After her PhD, Liberali then worked as a postdoctoral fellow in the Institute of Molecular Systems Biology at ETH Zurich.

In 2015, Liberali was made an assistant professor at the University of Basel. She was simultaneously appointed a group leader at the Friedrich Miescher Institute for Biomedical Research, where she was made Senior Group Leader in 2021.

Liberali makes use of a systems biology approach to understand tissue organisation. She is interested in the collective properties of multi-cellular systems and how their properties arise from the behaviour of individual cells. With this information, Liberali looks to understand cell reprogramming and disease. Her early work considered intestinal organoids and how they develop from stem cells.

In June 2022, Liberali was awarded the EMBO Gold Medal by the European Molecular Biology Organization. She was awarded EMBO Membership in 2022.

=== Awards and honours ===
- 2003 Italian Association for Cancer Research Fellowship
- 2015 Swiss National Science Foundation Professorship
- 2017 European Research Council (ERC) starting grant (SymBreakOragnoid)
- 2019 EMBO Young Investigator
- 2021 Morphology Prize. Award of the Swiss Society of Anatomy and Embryology
- 2022 Friedrich Miescher Award
- 2022 EMBO Gold Medal
- 2023 Anne-Heidenthal prize for fluorescence research
- 2024 Suffrage science award. Leading women in Life Science
- 2024 Research Price Basel City. Wissenschaftspreises der Stadt Basel
- 2026 I numeri 1. Italian in Switzerland.

=== Selected publications ===
Her publications include:

- Population context determines cell-to-cell variability in endocytosis and virus infection
- Self-organization and symmetry breaking in intestinal organoid development
- The closure of Pak1-dependent macropinosomes requires the phosphorylation of CtBP1/BARS

== Personal life ==
Liberali has two children and they speak five languages. She has said that her guiding advice for someone about to start their own laboratory is "Sometimes good ideas need time, and the courage to just try them.".
