= Alan MacDiarmid =

American-New Zealand chemist (1927–2007)

Alan MacDiarmid ONZ FRS
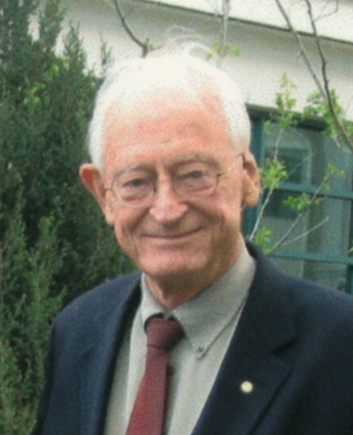
- Alan MacDiarmid in Beijing, China, 2005
- Born: Alan Graham MacDiarmid; April 14, 1927; Masterton, New Zealand
- Died: February 7, 2007 (aged 79); Drexel Hill, Pennsylvania, U.S.
- Citizenship: American
- Education: Victoria University of Wellington (BSc); University of Wisconsin–Madison (MS, PhD); University of Cambridge (PhD)
- Awards: The Francis J. Clamer Medal (1993); Nobel Prize in Chemistry (2000); William H. Nichols Medal (2002); Friendship Award (2004)
- Scientific career
- Workplaces: University of Pennsylvania; University of St Andrews; University of Texas at Dallas
- Thesis: The chemistry of some new derivatives of the silyl radical (1955)

Alan Graham MacDiarmid, ONZ FRS (14 April 1927 – 7 February 2007) was a New Zealand-American chemist, and one of three recipients of the Nobel Prize for Chemistry in 2000.

== Early life and education ==
MacDiarmid was born in Masterton, New Zealand, as one of five children – three brothers and two sisters. His family was relatively poor, and the Great Depression made life difficult in Masterton, due to which his family shifted to Lower Hutt, a few miles from Wellington, New Zealand. At around age ten, he developed an interest in chemistry from one of his father's old textbooks, and he taught himself from this book and from library books.

MacDiarmid was educated at Hutt Valley High School and Victoria University of Wellington.

In 1943, MacDiarmid passed the University of New Zealand's University Entrance Exam and its Medical Preliminary Exam. He then took up a part-time job as a "lab boy" or janitor at Victoria University of Wellington during his studies for a BSc degree, which he completed in 1947. He was then appointed demonstrator in the undergraduate laboratories. After completing an MSc in chemistry from the same university, he worked as an assistant in its chemistry department. It was here that he had his first publication in 1949, in the scientific journal Nature. He graduated in 1951 with first class honours, and won a Fulbright Fellowship to the University of Wisconsin–Madison. He majored in inorganic chemistry, receiving his M.S. degree in 1952 and his PhD in 1953. He then won a Shell Graduate Scholarship, which enabled him to go to Sidney Sussex College, Cambridge, where he completed a second PhD in 1955.

== Career and research ==
MacDiarmid worked in the School of Chemistry at the University of St Andrews in Scotland for a year as a member of the junior faculty. He then took a faculty position in chemistry at the University of Pennsylvania, United States, where he became a full professor in 1964. MacDiarmid spent the greater part of his career on the chemistry faculty of the University of Pennsylvania, where he worked for 45 years. The first twenty years of his research there focused on silicon chemistry. He was appointed Blanchard Professor of Chemistry in 1988.

In 2002 MacDiarmid also joined the faculty of the University of Texas at Dallas.

=== Conductive polymers ===
His best-known research was the discovery and development of conductive polymers—plastic materials that conduct electricity. He collaborated with the Japanese chemist Hideki Shirakawa and the American physicist Alan Heeger in this research and published the first results in 1977. The three of them shared the 2000 Nobel Prize in Chemistry for this work.

The Nobel Prize was awarded for the discovery that plastics can, after certain modifications, be made electrically conductive. The work progressed to yield important practical applications. Conductive plastics can be used for anti-static substances for photographic film and 'smart' windows that can exclude light. Semi-conductive polymers have been applied in light-emitting diodes, solar cells and displays in mobile telephones. Future developments in molecular electronics are predicted to dramatically increase the speed while reducing the size of computers.

MacDiarmid also travelled around the world for speaking engagements that impressed upon listeners the value of globalising the effort of innovation in the 21st century. In one of his last courses, in 2001, MacDiarmid elected to lead a small seminar of incoming freshmen about his research activities. Overall, his name is on over 600 published papers and 20 patents.

=== Selected publications ===
- Chiang, C.K.; Druy, M.A.; Gau, S.C.; Heeger, A.J.; Louis, E.J.; MacDiarmid, A.G.; Park, Y.W.; Shirakawa, H., "Synthesis of Highly Conducting Films of Derivatives of Polyacetylene, (CH)x," J. Am. Chem. Soc., 100, 1013 (1978).
- Heeger, A. J.; MacDiarmid, A. G., Polyacetylene, (CH){sub x}, as an Emerging Material for Solar Cell Applications. Final Technical Report, March 19, 1979 – March 18, 1980, University of Pennsylvania (June 1980).
- MacDiarmid, A. G., Energy Systems Based on Polyacetylene: Rechargeable Batteries and Schottky Barrier Solar Cells. Final Report, March 1, 1981 – February 29, 1984, University of Pennsylvania (February 1984).
- The Workshop on Conductive Polymers: Final Report, U.S. Department of Energy Division of Materials Sciences, Brookhaven National Laboratory (October 1985).
- Chiang, J.-C., and MacDiarmid, A.G., "Polyaniline': Protonic Acid Doping of the Emeraldine Form to the Metallic Regime," Synth. Met., 13, 193 (1986).
- MacDiarmid, A.G.; Chiang, J.-C.; Richter, A.F.; Epstein, A.J., "Polyaniline: A New Concept in Conducting Polymers," Synth. Met., 18, 285 (1987).
- MacDiarmid, A.G., Yang, L.S., Huang, W.-S., and Humphrey, B.D., "Polyaniline: Electrochemistry and Application to Rechargeable Batteries". Synth. Met., 18, 393 (1987).
- Kaner, R.B.; MacDiarmid, A.G., "Plastics That Conduct Electricity," Scientific American, 106 (February 1988).
- MacDiarmid, A.G.; Epstein, A.J., " 'Synthetic Metals': A Novel Role for Organic Polymers," Macromol. Chem., 51, 11 (1991).
- MacDiarmid, A.G.; Epstein, A.J., "Science and Technology of Conducting Polymers," in Frontiers of Polymer Research, P.N. Prasad and J.K. Nigam, Eds., Plenum Press, New York, 1991, p. 259.
- Wang, Z.H.; Li, C.; Scherr, E.M.; MacDiarmid, A.G.; Epstein, A.J., "Three Dimensionality of 'Metallic' States in Conducting Polymers: Polyaniline," Phys. Rev. Lett., 66, 1745 (1991).
- MacDiarmid, A.J.; Epstein, A.J., "The Concept of Secondary Doping as Applied to Polyaniline," Synth. Met., 65, 103 (1994).
- MacDiarmid, A.G., Zhou, Y., Feng, J., Furst, G.T., and Shedlow, A.M., "Isomers and Isomerization Processes in Poly-Anilines," Proc. ANTEC '99, Soc. Plastics Engr., 2, 1563 (1999).
- MacDiarmid, A.G., Norris, I.D., Jones, J.W.E., El-Sherif, M.A., Yuan, J., Han, B. and Ko, F.K., "Polyaniline Based Chemical Transducers with Sub-micron Dimensions," Polymeric Mat. Sci. & Eng., 83, 544 (2000).
- Norris, I.D., Shaker, M.M., Ko, F.K., and MacDiarmid, A.G., "Electrostatic Fabrication of Ultrafine Conducting Fibers: Polyaniline/Polyethylene Oxide Blends," Synth. Met., 114, 2 (2000).
- MacDiarmid, A.G., Jones, J.W.E., Norris, I.D., Gao, J., Johnson, J.A.T., Pinto, N.J., Hone, J., Han, B., Ko, F.K., Okuzaki, H., and Llaguno, M., "Electrostatically-Generated Nanofibers of Electronic Polymers," Synth. Met., 119, 27–30 (2001).
- Shimano, J.Y., and MacDiarmid, A.G., "Phase Segregation in Polyaniline: A Dynamic Block Copolymer," Synth. Met., 119, 365–366 (2001).
- Wang, P.C., and MacDiarmid, A.G., "Dependency of Properties of In Situ Deposited Polypyrrole Films on Dopant Anion and Substrate Surface," Synth. Met., 119, 267–268 (2001).
- Hohnholz, D., and MacDiarmid, A.G., "Line Patterning of Conducting Polymers: New Horizons for Inexpensive, Disposable Electronic Devices," Synth. Met., 121, 1327–1328 (2001).
- Premvardhan, L., Peteanu, L.A., Wang, P.-C., and MacDiarmid, A.G., "Electronic Properties of the Conducting Form of Polyaniline from Electroabsorption Measurements," Synth. Met., 116, 157–161 (2001).
- MacDiarmid, A.G. "Twenty-five Years of Conducting Polymers". Chem. Comm., 1–4 (2003).
- Tanner, D.B.; Doll, G.L.; Rao, A.M.; Eklund, P.C.; Arbuckle, G.A.; MacDiarmid, A.G. "Optical properties of potassium-doped polyacetylene". Synth. Met., 141, 75–79 (2004).
- Hohnholz, D.; Okuzaki, H.; MacDiarmid, A.G. "Plastic electronic devices through line patterning of conducting polymers". Adv. Funct. Mater., 15, 51–56 (2005).
- Venancio, E.C; Wang, P-C.; MacDiarmid, A.G. "The Azanes: A Class of Material Incorporating Nano/Micro Self-Assembled Hollow Spheres Obtained By Aqueous Oxidative Polymerization of Aniline". Synth. Met., 156, 357 (2006).
- MacDiarmid, A.G.; Venancio, E.C. "Agrienergy (Agriculture/Energy): What Does the Future Hold?”. Experimental Biology and Medicine., 231, 1212 (2006).

== Awards and honours ==
MacDiarmid won numerous awards and honours including:

- Victoria University of Wellington gave MacDiarmid an honorary doctorate in 1999 and in 2001 created the Alan MacDiarmid Chair in Physical Chemistry. The MacDiarmid Institute for Advanced Materials and Nanotechnology and the Alan MacDiarmid building, opened in May 2010, at the university are named after him.
- Awarded the 1999 American Chemical Society Award in Materials Chemistry.
- In 2000 the Royal Society of New Zealand awarded him its top honour, the Rutherford Medal.
- In 2002, he was elected a member of the United States National Academy of Sciences.
- In the 2002 New Year Honours, MacDiarmid was appointed to the Order of New Zealand, which is the highest honour the country awards.
- MacDiarmid was elected a Fellow of the Royal Society (FRS) in 2003
- In 2004, he received the Friendship Award, the highest honour of the People's Republic of China for foreign experts.
- The Alan G. MacDiarmid NanoTech Institute at the University of Texas at Dallas was named after him posthumously in 2007.
- The Alan G. MacDiarmid Institute at Jilin University in China was named after him since 2001.
- MacDiarmid Place in Lower Hutt, built in 2013 on the grounds of the closed Waiwhetu School of which he was a pupil, is named after Alan MacDiarmid.

== Personal life ==
Towards the end of his life, MacDiarmid was ill with myelodysplastic syndrome. In early February 2007 he was planning to travel back to New Zealand, when he fell down the stairs in his home in Drexel Hill, Pennsylvania, a suburb of Philadelphia, and died on 7 February 2007. He is buried at Arlington Cemetery in Drexel Hill.

MacDiarmid's first wife, Marian Mathieu, who he had married in 1954, died in 1990. He is survived by four children: Heather McConnell, Dawn Hazelett, Duncan MacDiarmid and Gail Williams, from their marriage and nine grandchildren: Dr. Sean McConnell, Dr. Ryan McConnell, Rebecca McConnell, Dr. Clayton Hazelett, Wesley Hazelett, Langston MacDiarmid, Aubree Williams, Austin Williams and George Williams. MacDiarmid was also survived by his second wife, Gayl Gentile, whom he married in 2005; she died in 2014.

MacDiarmid was a first cousin of New Zealand expatriate painter Douglas MacDiarmid. The year after Alan received the Nobel Prize for Chemistry, Douglas painted a portrait of his cousin for the New Zealand Portrait Gallery.

MacDiarmid was also active as a naturist and nudist, and considered himself a sun-worshipper and keen waterskier.

== Legacy ==
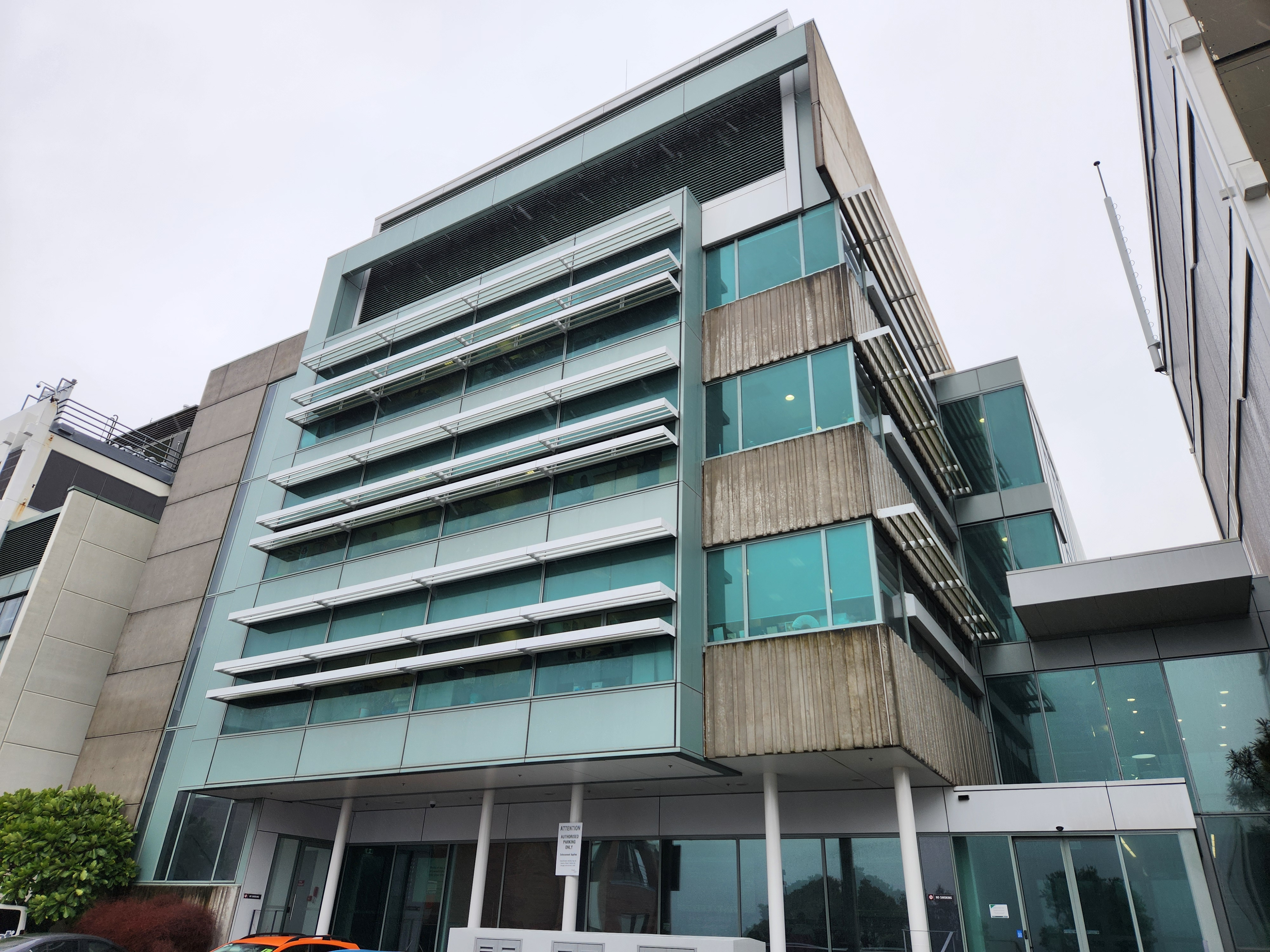
The Alan MacDiarmid building in 2026

In 2011 the Alan MacDiarmid building at the Kelburn campus of Victoria University of Wellington was opened. MacDiarmid's widow was present at the opening and gifted his Nobel Prize medal to the university, who put it on display.
