= Jamshed R. Tata =

Indian-born British endocrinologist (1930–2020)

Jamshed Rustom Tata, FRS (13 April 1930 – 8 October 2020) was an Indian-born British endocrinologist who spent most of his career at the National Institute for Medical Research researching thyroid hormones. His key discovery was that thyroid hormones control metamorphosis in frogs by regulation the action of genes.

== Early life and education ==
Jamshed Rustom Tata was born in Bombay on 13 April 1930. He was awarded his BSc from Bombay University in 1949, then MSc from the Indian Institute of Science in 1951. He then went to University of Paris and was awarded his PhD in 1954.

== Scientific career ==
Tata started his scientific career as a postdoctoral fellowship at Sloan-Kettering Institute between 1954–56 and then moved to NIMR (National Institute for Medical Research, London) in 1956. He spent most of his career at NIMR, except for a two-year spell as visiting scientist at the University of Stockholm (1960-1962). He was a staff scientist (1962-1973). In 1973 he became Head of the Division of Developmental Biochemistry and continued in this post till his retirement in 1996. After retirement he continued as a visiting scientist at NIMR till the site closed in 2016. While at NIMR he worked closely with Rosalind Pitt-Rivers and co-authored a number of books with her.

Tata was recognised for his work on thyroid hormones, discovering that the hormones act by regulating the activity of genes, rather than controlling metabolism, authoring over 200 papers, including a history of developmental biology at NIMR

Tata was awarded the Colworth Medal by the Biochemical Society in 1964. He was elected as FRS in 1973

== Personal life and death ==
Tata lived in Mill Hill, London for the last 60 years of his life. He died in London on 8 October 2020, at the age of 90. His French wife, Renée, predeceased him. They are survived by their two sons and one daughter.
