= Richard A. Flavell =

English molecular biologist

Richard A. Flavell FRS
- Born: August 23, 1945
- Education: University of Hull
- Awards: Colworth Medal (1980); William B. Coley Award (2012)
- Scientific career
- Workplaces: Yale School of Medicine; Biogen; National Institute for Medical Research; University of Amsterdam

Richard Anthony Flavell (born 23 August 1945 in Chelmsford, Essex) is an English molecular biologist, and Sterling Professor of Immunobiology, at Yale School of Medicine where he uses transgenic and gene-targeted mice to study Innate and Adaptive immunity, T cell tolerance and activation in immunity and autoimmunity, apoptosis, and regulation of T cell differentiation. He is an investigator at the Howard Hughes Medical Institute. In 2013, Flavell received the Vilcek Prize in Biomedical Science. In July 2016, Flavell received an honorary doctorate degree from the University of Hull. He is an honorary member of the British Society for Immunology.

== Life ==
He earned a Ph.D. from University of Hull in 1970. He studied at the University of Amsterdam, and the University of Zurich, where he studied with Charles Weissmann. He taught at University of Amsterdam from 1974 to 1979, then headed the Laboratory of Gene Structure and Expression at the National Institute for Medical Research, Mill Hill, London from 1979 to 1982. Following a move to Biogen in 1982, he became the President and Chief Scientific Officer of Biogen until 1988, when he moved to Yale.
