= Nicholas Kester Tonks =

British biochemist

Nicholas Kester Tonks FRS is a professor in Cold Spring Harbor Laboratory. His research is mainly focused on studying the function and regulation of protein tyrosine phosphatases.

He did his undergraduate in Biochemistry from the University of Oxford. After graduation, he joined Sir Philip Cohen lab in University of Dundee for his PhD study in protein phosphatase from 1982 to 1985.

Tonks was awarded the Colworth Medal in 1993. He was elected a Fellow of the Royal Society in 2001.
