= Ian Sneddon =

Scottish mathematician

Professor Ian Sneddon OBE FRS FRSE FIMA
- Born: Ian Naismith Sneddon; 8 December 1919; Glasgow, Scotland
- Died: 4 November 2000 (aged 80); Glasgow, Scotland
- Education: University of Glasgow
- Awards: FRS; Eringen Medal (1979)
- Scientific career
- Workplaces: University of Glasgow
- Doctoral students: Anthony Spencer

Ian Naismith Sneddon (8 December 1919 Glasgow, Scotland – 4 November 2000 Glasgow, Scotland) was a Scottish mathematician who worked on analysis and applied mathematics.

== Life ==
Sneddon was born in Glasgow on 8 December 1919, the son of Mary Ann Cameron and Naismith Sneddon. He was educated at Hyndland School in Glasgow.

He studied mathematics and physics at the University of Glasgow, graduating with a BSc. He then went to the University of Cambridge, gaining an MA in 1941. From 1942 to 1945, during World War II, he served as a Scientific Officer to the Ministry of Supply. After the war he worked as a Research Officer for H H Wills Laboratory at the University of Bristol. In 1946, he began lecturing in Natural Philosophy (physics) at the University of Glasgow.

In 1950, he received a professorship at University College of North Staffordshire. In 1956, he returned to the University of Glasgow as Professor of Mathematics.

In 1958, he was elected a Fellow of the Royal Society of Edinburgh. His proposers were Robert Alexander Rankin, Philip Ivor Dee, William Marshall Smart and Edward Copson. He won the Society's Makdougall-Brisbane Prize for the period 1956–58. In 1983, he was further elected a Fellow of the Royal Society of London.

He retired in 1985, and died in Glasgow on 4 November 2000.

== Family ==
In 1943, he married Mary Campbell Macgregor.

== Research ==
Sneddon's research was published widely including:

- with Nevill Mott: Wave mechanics and its applications, 1948
- Fourier transforms, 1951
- Special functions of mathematical physics and chemistry, 1956
- Elements of partial differential equations, 1957
- with James George Defares: An introduction to the mathematics of medicine and biology, 1960
- Mixed boundary problems in potential theory, 1966
- Lectures on transform methods, 1967
- with Morton Lowengrub: Crack problems in the classical theory of elasticity, 1969
- The use of integral transforms, 1972
- The linear theory of thermoelasticity, 1974
- Encyclopaedic dictionary of mathematics for engineers and applied scientists, 1976
- The use of operators of fractional integration in applied mathematics, 1979
- with E. L. Ince: The solution of ordinary differential equations, 1987

== Awards and honours ==
Sneddon received Honorary Doctorates from Warsaw University (1973), Heriot-Watt University (1982) University of Hull (1983) and University of Strathclyde (1984).
