= EMBO Gold Medal =

Annual award of the European Molecular Biology Organization (EMBO)

- Sponsored by: European Molecular Biology Organization (EMBO)
- Date: 1986
- Presented by: European Molecular Biology Organization
- Reward: €10,000
- Website: www.embo.org/funding-awards/gold-medal

The EMBO Gold Medal is an annual award of the European Molecular Biology Organization (EMBO) given to young scientists for outstanding contributions to the life sciences in Europe. Laureates receive a medal and €10,000 and are invited to receive the award and present their research at the Cell Bio Meeting and to write a review published in The EMBO Journal. Medallists can only be nominated by EMBO Members.

== EMBO Gold Medallists ==
Previous EMBO Gold Medal awardees include

- 2025 Tanmay A. M. Bharat UK and David Bikard, FR
- 2024 Elvan Böke, ES
- 2023 Julia Mahamid, DE
- 2022 Prisca Liberali, CH
- 2021 Andrea Ablasser, CH
- 2020 Sarah-Maria Fendt, BE, and Markus Ralser, DE
- 2019 M. Madan Babu, UK, and Paola Picotti, CH
- 2018 Marek Basler, CH, and Melina Schuh, DE
- 2017 Maya Schuldiner, IL
- 2016 Richard Benton, CH, and Ben Lehner, ES
- 2015 Sarah Teichmann, UK, and Ido Amit, IL
- 2014 Sophie G. Martin, CH
- 2013 Thijn Brummelkamp, NL
- 2012 Jiří Friml, BE
- 2011 Simon Boulton, UK
- 2010 Jason W. Chin, UK
- 2009 Olivier Voinnet, FR (revoked in January 2016)
- 2008 James Briscoe, UK
- 2007 Jan Löwe, UK
- 2006 Frank Uhlmann, UK
- 2005 Dario Alessi, UK
- 2004 María Blasco, ES
- 2003 Anthony Hyman, DE
- 2002 Amanda Fisher, UK
- 2001 Matthew Freeman (scientist), UK
- 2000 Christof Niehrs, DE and Daniel St Johnston, UK
- 1999 Konrad Basler, CH
- 1998 Adriano Aguzzi, IT
- 1997 Dirk Görlich, DE
- 1996 Enrico Coen, UK
- 1995 Richard Treisman, UK
- 1994 Paolo Sassone-Corsi, IT
- 1993 Jim Smith, UK
- 1992 Carl-Henrik Heldin, SE
- 1991 Patrick Stragier, FR
- 1990 Erwin Wagner, AT
- 1989 Hugh Pelham, UK
- 1988 Antonio Lanzavecchia, IT
- 1987 Barbara Pearse, UK
- 1986 John Tooze, DE

== See also ==
- List of biology awards
