= Melina Schuh =

German molecular biologist

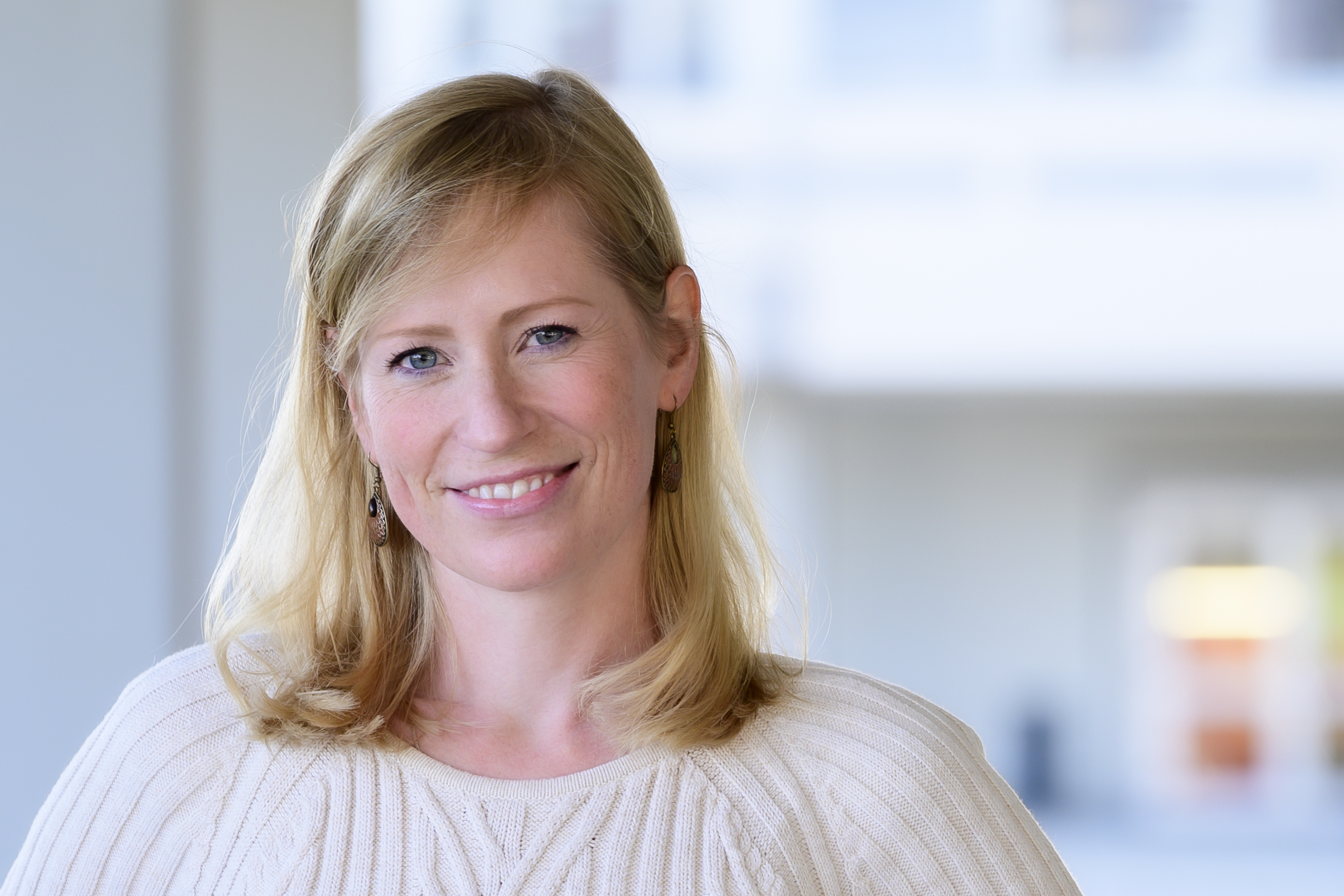
- Schuh in 2020
- Born: Germany
- Education: EMBL Heidelberg; University of Bayreuth
- Awards: EMBO Gold Medal

Melina Schuh is a German biochemist and Director at the Max Planck Institute for Multidisciplinary Sciences. She is known for her work on meiosis in mammalian oocytes, for her studies on the mechanisms leading to the age-related decline in female fertility, and for the development of the Trim-Away protein depletion method.

== Early life and education ==
Schuh was born in 1980 in Germany and grew up in Bad Pyrmont. In 2004, she received her diploma in biochemistry from the University of Bayreuth, Germany, where she studied the incorporation of Cenp-A into centromeres in Drosophila embryos with Stefan Heidmann and Christian Lehner.

== Career ==
Melina Schuh did her PhD with Jan Ellenberg at the European Molecular Biology Laboratory (EMBL) in Heidelberg, Germany, where she established methods for high-resolution imaging of meiosis in live mouse oocytes. She used these methods to study the organization and positioning of the spindle in mouse oocytes. In 2009, Schuh became a Group Leader at the MRC Laboratory of Molecular Biology in Cambridge, UK. In 2016, she was appointed Director at the Max Planck Institute for Biophysical Chemistry. In 2022, the Institute merged with the Max Planck Institute for Experimental Medicine to form the Max Planck Institute for Multidisciplinary Sciences.

Schuh's laboratory studies the development and function of mammalian oocytes. They are also investigating the causes of the age-related decline in female fertility. Schuh's work focuses on the process of oocyte division, in which oocytes mature into eggs by extruding half of their chromosomes in a small cell termed the polar body. This requires the spindle apparatus in these cells to be positioned asymmetrically. She discovered a role for proteins that control actin nucleation in the positioning of the spindle. In studying how actin helps position the spindle, she discovered that vesicles carrying specific signals can change the organization and density of actin networks. In addition, her group developed a strategy to perform high-content RNAi screens for meiotic genes in mouse oocytes.

Errors in oocyte division can lead to miscarriage and age-related female infertility. Working with Bourn Hall Clinic, the clinic that first pioneered IVF, Schuh studied human oocyte divisions directly, instead of using mouse oocytes as a model system. She found that human oocytes have a surprisingly slow and error-prone mechanism for assembling the meiotic spindle, increasing the likelihood of segregation errors. She has also investigated the reasons why older mothers have a higher rate of pregnancy loss, and found that oocytes from older mothers have a higher frequency of defects in chromosome architecture.

Her lab developed a method for the acute degradation of endogenous proteins, called Trim-Away, and established essential functions for actin and a liquid-like spindle domain in acentrosomal spindle assembly. Recent work from her lab has identified the cause of spindle instability in human oocytes and an mRNA storage mechanism in mammalian oocytes.

== Honors and awards ==
- 2012 : EMBO Young Investigator
- 2013 : ERC Starting Grant
- 2014 : Lister Institute Research Prize
- 2014 : Biochemical Society Early Career Award
- 2015 : John Kendrew Young Scientist Award
- 2018 : EMBO Gold Medal
- 2019 : Colworth Medal, Biochemical Society
- 2019 : Gottfried Wilhelm Leibniz Prize
- 2019 : Member of the German Academy of Sciences Leopoldina
- 2021 : Selected for the book "Ahead of the Curve" about the female pioneers of the LMB
- 2023 : Honorary Professor University of Göttingen
- 2026 : Elected a Fellow of the Royal Society
