= Helen Walden =

English structural biologist

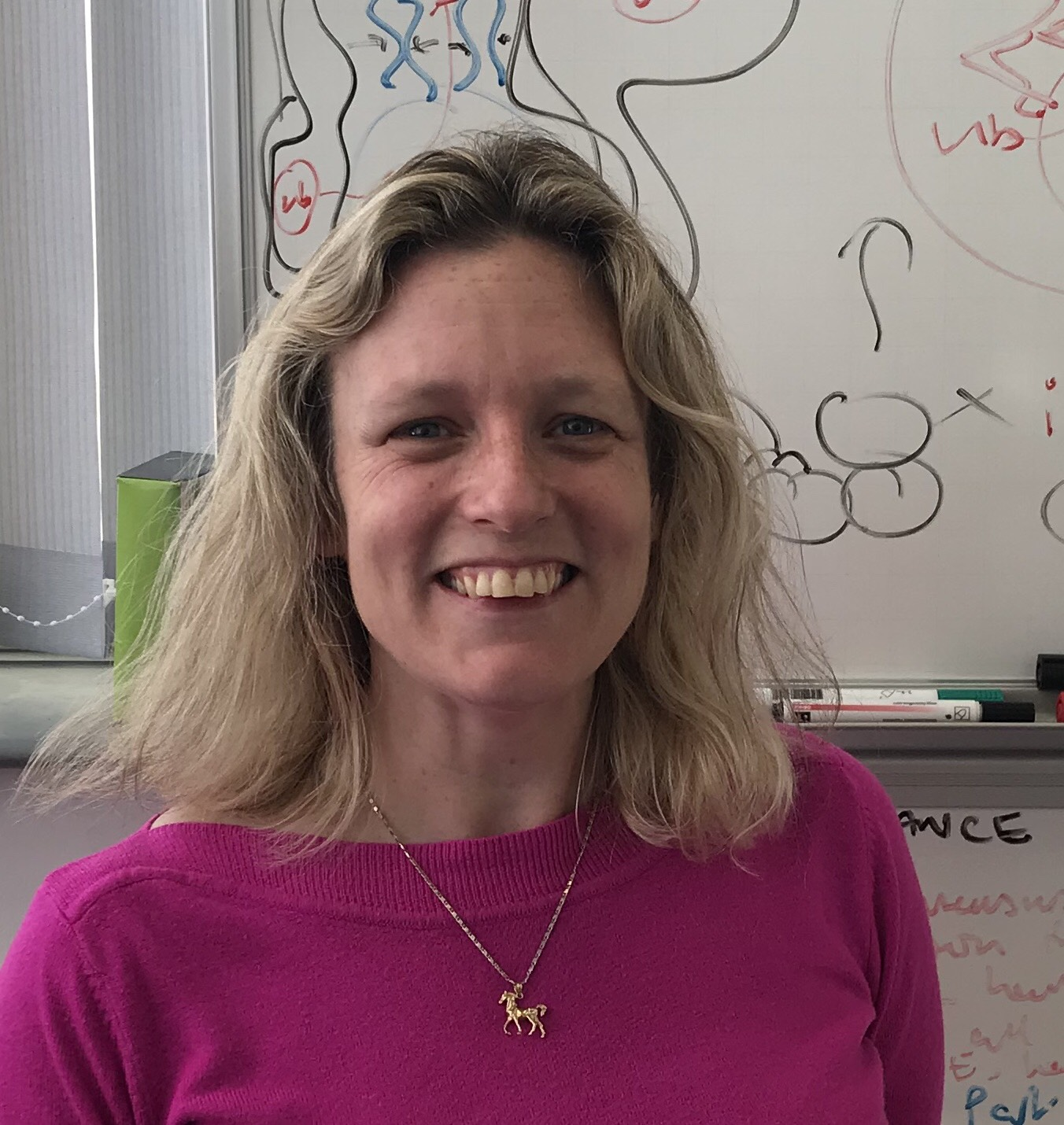
- Helen Walden
- Known for: Study of Ubiquitination
- Awards: Colworth Medal (2015) EMBO Member (2022)
- Scientific career
- Fields: Structural biology

Helen Walden FRSE is an English structural biologist who received the Colworth medal from the Biochemical Society in 2015. She was awarded European Molecular Biology Organization (EMBO) membership in 2022. She is a Professor of Structural Biology at the University of Glasgow and has made significant contributions to the Ubiquitination field.

== Education and academic career ==
Helen Walden studied for a BSc in Biochemistry at the University of Bath. She moved to the University of St Andrews and was awarded a PhD for investigating the structural basis of protein hyperthermostability. After a postdoctoral fellowship at St Jude's Children's Research Hospital, Walden moved to London to set up a lab at the Cancer Research UK London Research Institute (and now part of the Francis Crick Institute). After tenure, Walden moved to the MRC-Phosphorylation and Ubiquitylation Unit at the University of Dundee where in 2016 she was promoted to professor. In 2017, Walden relocated her lab to the University of Glasgow as Professor of Structural Biology.

== Research interests ==
At St Jude's Children's Research Hospital, Helen Walden developed her interest in the mechanisms of ubiquitination, solving the structure of the E1 for Nedd8. In London, Walden studied the specificity and regulation of E3 ubiquitin ligases. In recent years Walden has studied the mechanism and disease association of E2-conjugating enzymes. Walden has investigated the role of Parkin in Parkinson's disease. Her study of the Fanconi Anemia pathway has allowed Walden to begin developing small molecules to target the pathway.

== Professional associations and awards ==
- In 2011, Walden joined the European Molecular Biology Organisation (EMBO) Young Investigator Program.
- In 2015, Walden was awarded the Colworth medal from the Biochemical Society.
- In 2016, Walden was awarded an ERC grant of €2 million to investigate DNA damage and repair.
- In 2022, Walden was named as a Fellow of the Royal Society of Edinburgh.
- In 2022, Walden was awarded EMBO membership.
