= Florey Lecture =

Lecture organized by the Royal Society of London

The Florey Lecture was a lecture organised by the Royal Society of London.

== List of lecturers ==
Year	Name	Lecture	Notes
1982	Andrew Fielding Huxley	Discovery: accident of design?	—
1983	Frank John Fenner	Biological control, as exemplified by smallpox eradication and myxomatosis.	—
1984	Arnold Stanley Vincent Burgen	Order and disorder: targets for drug action.	—
1985	Gustav Joseph Victor Nossal	The regulatory biology of antibody formation.	—
1986	Michael Anthony Epstein	Vaccine prevention of virus-induced human cancers.	—
1987	Rodney Robert Porter	Corticomotoneuronal projections: synaptic events related to skilled movement.	—
1988	John Bertrand Gurdon	How an egg makes an embryo: the initiation of cell differentiation.	—
1989	Antony Basten	Self-tolerance: the key to autoimmunity.	—
1990	Paul Nurse	How is the cell cycle regulated?	—
1991	Donald Metcalf	The colony stimulating factors: discovery to clinical use.	—
1992	Hugh Pelham	The secretion of protein by cells.	—
