= Erwin Friedrich Wagner =

Austrian biochemist (born 1950)

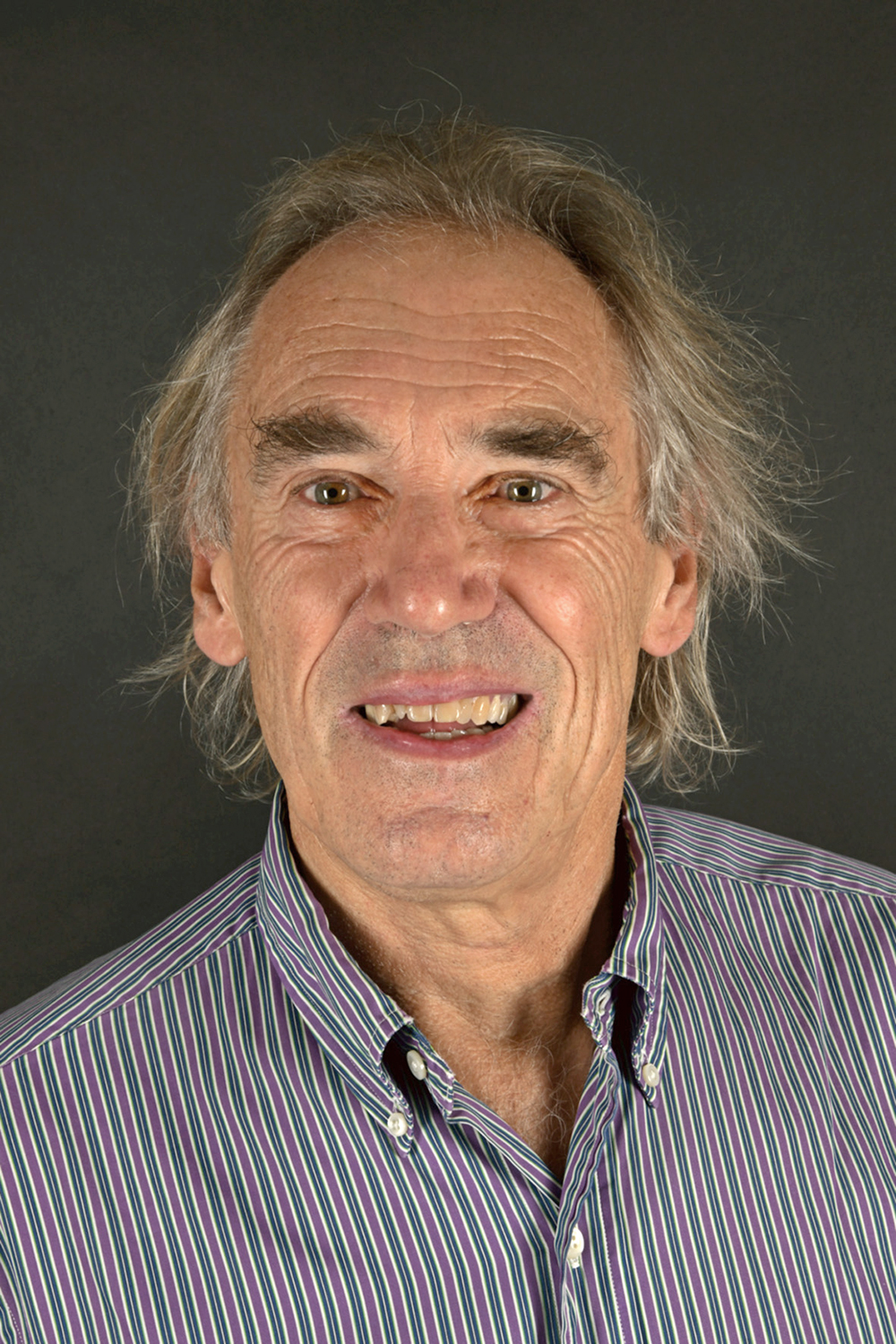
- Wagner in November 2019
- Born: 25 November 1950 (age 75); Wolfsberg, Austria
- Citizenship: Austrian
- Education: University of Graz (MSc); University of Innsbruck (PhD)
- Awards: National Academy of Sciences International Member (2021); Charles Rodolphe Brupbacher Award for Cancer Research (2003); Wittgenstein-Preis (1996); Alois Sonnleitner Prize (1995); EMBO Gold Medal (1990); EMBO Member (1988)
- Scientific career
- Fields: cancer biology, molecular biology, mouse genetics and development biology
- Workplaces: Medical University of Vienna; Spanish National Cancer Research Center (CNIO); Research Institute of Molecular Pathology (IMP); European Molecular Biology Laboratory (EMBL); Fox Chase Cancer Center (FCCC); Max Planck Institute for Molecular Genetics
- Thesis: Regulation of gene expression after virus infection. (1978)
- Doctoral advisor: Manfred Schweiger

Erwin Friedrich Wagner (born 25 November 1950) is an Austrian biochemist known for his research on the molecular basis of cancer and associated conditions such as inflammation and cachexia. He was deputy director of the Spanish National Cancer Research Center (CNIO) in Madrid, Spain, until 2019. Since 2019, Wagner is a group leader affiliated with the Medical University of Vienna.

== Early life and education ==
Erwin Wagner was born in Wolfsberg in the south of Austria. From 1974, he studied technical chemistry at the University of Graz, obtaining an engineering degree in 1974. In 1975, he worked in the lab of Fritz Paltauf on lipid chemistry.

During his PhD studies, Erwin Wagner joined the Max Planck Institute for Molecular Genetics in Berlin with a Max Planck Fellowship for one year in 1976. He then joined the lab of Manfred Schweiger at the University of Innsbruck in 1977. Wagner obtained his PhD with a thesis on "Regulation of gene expression after virus infection" in 1978.

== Career ==
In 1979, Erwin Wagner began his postdoctoral research at the Fox Chase Cancer Center in Philadelphia, United States in the laboratory of Beatrice Mintz as a Max Kade Fellow. Wagner's worked focused on the genetic control of mouse development working to develop techniques allowing the micro-injection of DNA into fertilized eggs as well as the development of gene transfer technologies into stem cells and mice.

In 1983, Wagner obtained a lecture qualification (Habilitation) by Innsbruck University and became a Group Leader at the European Molecular Biology Laboratory in Heidelberg, Germany.

In 1988, Wagner was appointed senior scientist at the then newly founded Research Institute of Molecular Pathology (IMP) in Vienna, Austria. Wagner was a founding member of the IMP. From 1997 until 2008, Wagner was appointed the Deputy Director of the IMP.

In 2008, Wagner left the IMP to become Deputy Director and Head of the Cancer Cell Biology Program at the Spanish National Cancer Research Center (CNIO) in Madrid, Spain. In 2018, Wagner left CNIO and returned to Vienna in January 2019, where he is a Group Leader affiliated with the Department of Dermatology and Department of Laboratory Medicine at the Medical University of Vienna.

He is a member of the Editorial Board for Developmental Cell.

== Research ==
Erwin Wagner's studies are focused in the area of gene function in both healthy and pathological states. His work is focused in the fields of cancer biology and tumor development. He investigates the functions of transcription factor complexes regulating cell proliferation, differentiation and oncogenesis, as well as the cross-talk between organs, in both mice models and humans. He works to define and understand the molecular pathways that lead to disease, cancer development and works to identify novel therapeutic targets to treat human disease.

== Awards and achievements ==
- EMBO Gold Medal (1990);
- Max Planck Research Prize (1993);
- Alois Sonnleitner Prize of the Austrian Academy of Sciences (1995);
- Wittgenstein Award of the Austrian government (1996);
- Charles Rodolphe Brupbacher Award for Cancer Research (2003).

He was elected member of the European Molecular Biology Organisation (EMBO) in 1988; of the Academia Europaea in 1998; corresponding membership of the Austrian Academy of Sciences in 2005; and International Member of the National Academy of Sciences (NAS) in 2021. He won two ERC Advanced Grants, one in 2009, one in 2017.
