= Tim Palmer (physicist) =

British meteorologist

Tim Palmer CBE FRS
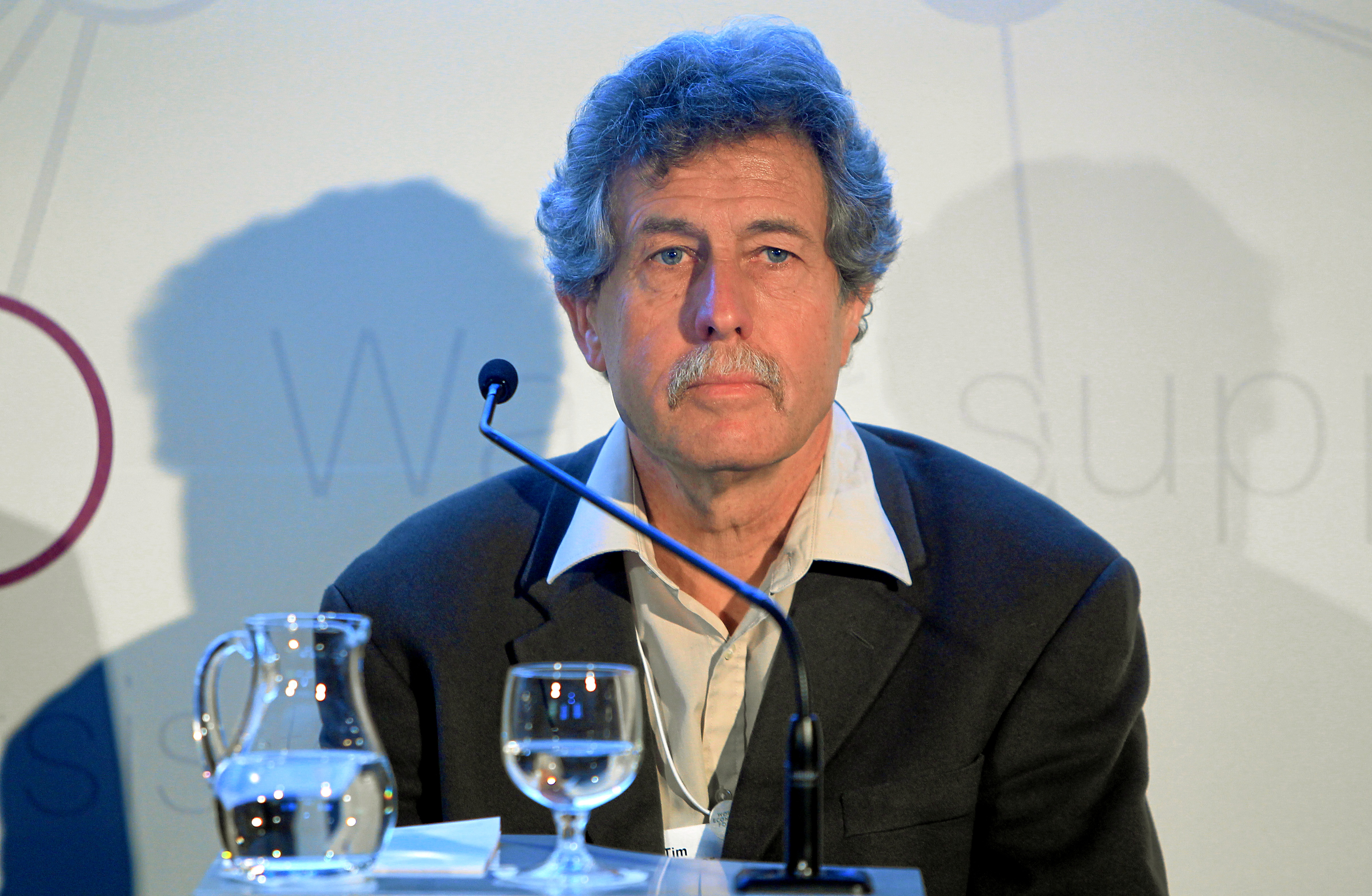
- Palmer at the World Economic Forum Annual Meeting in Davos 2013
- Born: Timothy Noel Palmer; 31 December 1952 (age 73); Kingston upon Thames, Surrey, England
- Education: University of Bristol (BSc); University of Oxford (DPhil)
- Awards: Fellow of the Royal Society (2003); Dirac Gold Medal (2014); Carl-Gustaf Rossby Research Medal (2010); Royal Astronomical Society Gold Medal for Geophysics (2023); Honorary Member, Royal Irish Academy (2023)
- Scientific career
- Thesis: Covariant conservation equations and their relation to the energy- momentum concept in general relativity (1977)
- Doctoral advisor: Dennis William Sciama
- Website: www2.physics.ox.ac.uk/contacts/people/palmer

Timothy Noel Palmer CBE FRS (born 31 December 1952) is a mathematical physicist by training. He has spent most of his career working on the dynamics and predictability of weather and climate. Among various research achievements, he pioneered the development of probabilistic ensemble forecasting techniques for weather and climate prediction (at the Met Office and the European Centre for Medium-Range Weather Forecasts). These techniques are now standard in operational weather and climate prediction around the world, and are central for reliable decision making for many commercial and humanitarian applications.

== Early life and education ==
Palmer was born in Kingston upon Thames, Surrey in 1952. He received a 1st Class Joint Honours Degree in Mathematics and Physics from the University of Bristol and a Doctor of Philosophy in General Relativity Theory from the University of Oxford.

== Research ==
Palmer's research has focused on the nonlinear predictability and dynamics of the climate system. He co-discovered the world's largest breaking waves, and proposed a nonlinear framework for the regional manifestation of climate change, based on the nonlinear dynamics of quasi-stationary weather regimes. He was among the first to propose the importance of developing unified or "seamless" weather and climate prediction models. As of 2016 Palmer's research is focussed on the development of stochastic parametrisations in weather and climate simulators, and the application of inexact computing techniques for developing ultra-high resolution climate models. Palmer believes strongly that human and computing resources must be pooled internationally to develop reliable climate prediction systems. He remains active in the area of fundamental physics, promoting the synergistic "Cosmological Invariant Set Postulate" as a primitive geometric principle for physics of the large and small.

== Career ==
After a chance meeting with geophysicist Raymond Hide, he became interested in climate and was employed by the Met Office – including a year at the University of Washington. In 1986 he joined the European Centre for Medium-Range Weather Forecasts where he led the newly formed Predictability and Diagnostics Division, where he led the development of the ECMWF medium-range ensemble prediction system and the European DEMETER multi-model ensemble seasonal climate prediction system. In 2010 Palmer became a Professor of Climate Physics at the University of Oxford, being one of the "2010 Anniversary" Royal Society Research Professors, created to celebrate the Royal Society's 350th Anniversary. At Oxford, Palmer is additionally co-director of the Oxford Martin Programme on Modelling and Predicting Climate and is a professorial fellow at Jesus College, Oxford.

== Awards and honours ==
Palmer was elected a Fellow of the Royal Society (FRS) in 2003, and was appointed Commander of the Order of the British Empire (CBE) in the 2015 New Year Honours for services to science. Other awards include:

- World Meteorological Organisation Norbert Gerbier-Mumm International Award (2006)
- American Meteorological Society Carl-Gustaf Rossby Research Medal (2010)
- Institute of Physics Dirac Gold Medal (for theoretical physics) (2014)
- International member of the American Philosophical Society (2015)
- Honorary Doctor of Science, University of Bristol (2016)
- International member of the Accademia dei Lincei (2017)
- European Geosciences Union Lewis Fry Richardson Medal (for Nonlinear Processes in Geosciences (2018)
- Honorary member of the American Meteorological Society (2019)
- International Honorary Member of the American Academy of the Arts and Sciences (2019)
- Honorary Member, Royal Meteorological Society (2020)
- Member of the Foundational Questions Institute (2020)
- International Member of the U.S. National Academy of Sciences (2020)
- Royal Astronomical Society Gold Medal (for Geophysics) (2023)
- Honorary member, Royal Irish Academy (2023)

== The Primacy of Doubt ==
In October 2022 Palmer published a popular science book on the science of uncertainty called The Primacy of Doubt. Without equations, it describes the physics and mathematics of chaos, applying it to weather, climate, economics, pandemics, conflict, human creativity, free will and consciousness. The book also discusses the question of whether quantum uncertainty is different from chaotic uncertainty. The book received favourable blurbs from Roger Penrose, Martin Rees, Syukuro Manabe and Sabine Hossenfelder. Brian Clegg of Popular Science wrote "This is quite possibly the best popular science book I've ever read (and I've read many hundreds)."

== See also ==
- Superdeterminism
