= Hugh Pelham =

British cell biologist

Sir Hugh Pelham FRS FMedSci
- Born: Hugh Reginald Brentnall Pelham; 26 August 1954 (age 71)
- Education: Marlborough College
- Alma mater: University of Cambridge (BA, MA, PhD)
- Spouse: Mariann Bienz (m. 1996)
- Awards: Knight Bachelor (2011); Florey Lecture (1992); Croonian Medal and Lecture (1999); King Faisal International Prize (1996); Louis-Jeantet Prize for Medicine (1991); EMBO Gold Medal (1989); Colworth Medal (1988)
- Scientific career
- Fields: Cell biology; Biochemistry; Molecular biology
- Institutions: Laboratory of Molecular Biology; University of Zurich; Carnegie Institution of Washington–Baltimore
- Thesis: Transcription and Translation in Reticulocyte Lysates (1978)
- Doctoral advisor: Tim Hunt; Richard J. Jackson
- Doctoral students: Sean Munro; Peter Karl Sorger
- Website: www2.mrc-lmb.cam.ac.uk/group-leaders/emeritus/hugh-pelham/

Sir Hugh Reginald Brentnall Pelham, FRS FMedSci (born 26 August 1954) is a cell biologist who has contributed to our understanding of the body's response to rises in temperature through the synthesis of heat shock proteins. He served as director of the Medical Research Council (MRC) Laboratory of Molecular Biology (LMB) between 2006 and 2018.

== Education ==
Pelham was educated at Marlborough College in Marlborough, Wiltshire and Christ's College, Cambridge. He graduated with a Master of Arts degree in Natural Sciences followed by a PhD for research on transcription and translation in immature blood cells (Reticulocytes). His PhD was supervised by Richard J. Jackson and Tim Hunt, who went on to receive the Nobel Prize in Physiology or Medicine in 2001.

== Career and research ==
Pelham is an authority on the movement of proteins within cells. Pelhams's work has explained how some proteins can protect cells from damage. He has also shown how cells remove damaged or unwanted proteins – vital for maintaining their healthy functioning. More recently, his research investigates how proteins are modified and sorted to their correct places within cells and aims to find ways of blocking these processes.

Pelham has been a visiting professor at the University of Zurich and held many posts at the Laboratory of Molecular Biology in Cambridge, where he succeeded Richard Henderson to become the LMB's Director in 2006. He has been an Honorary Professor of Molecular Biology at the University of Cambridge since 2015.

=== Awards and honours ===
Pelham was knighted by Elizabeth II in the 2011 Birthday Honours and elected a Fellow of the Royal Society (FRS) in 1988. His certificate of election reads:

Distinguished for his contributions to protein biosynthesis, the control of gene activity and intracellular sorting. He developed a sensitive in vitro translation system, with which he discovered that naturally "leaky" termination codons exist in plant virus RNAs, and achieved the first correct synthesis and processing of viral polyproteins in vitro. He showed that the transcription factor TFIIIA, which is required in Xenopus oocytes for 5S rDNA transcription, binds to the gene product, %S RNA and is present in large amounts in oocytes. From studies on heat shock genes, he identified the first regulatory DNA sequence (the "Pelham" box) in a eukaryotic gene, proving this alone could confer heat inducibility on another gene. He has shown that this sequence is the binding site for a transcription factor which is modified by heat shock, thus establishing the basic mechanism of induction of these genes. He has clarified the function of heat shock proteins, finding that two of these reside in the lumen of the endoplasmic reticulum. This led to his discovery that a C-terminal amino acid sequence is a novel sorting signal, preventing proteins from being exported from the lumen of the endoplasmic reticulum.

Pelham gave the Florey Lecture in 1992, was elected a Fellow of the Academy of Medical Sciences (FMedSci) in 1998. In 1999 he gave the Croonian Lecture and he was awarded the King Faisal International Prize in 1996. He won the Louis-Jeantet Prize for Medicine in 1991 and the EMBO Gold Medal in 1989. He was awarded the Colworth Medal from the Biochemical Society in 1988 and elected a member of the European Molecular Biology Organization (EMBO) in 1985.
