= Eric Oldfield (academic) =

English chemist (born 1948)

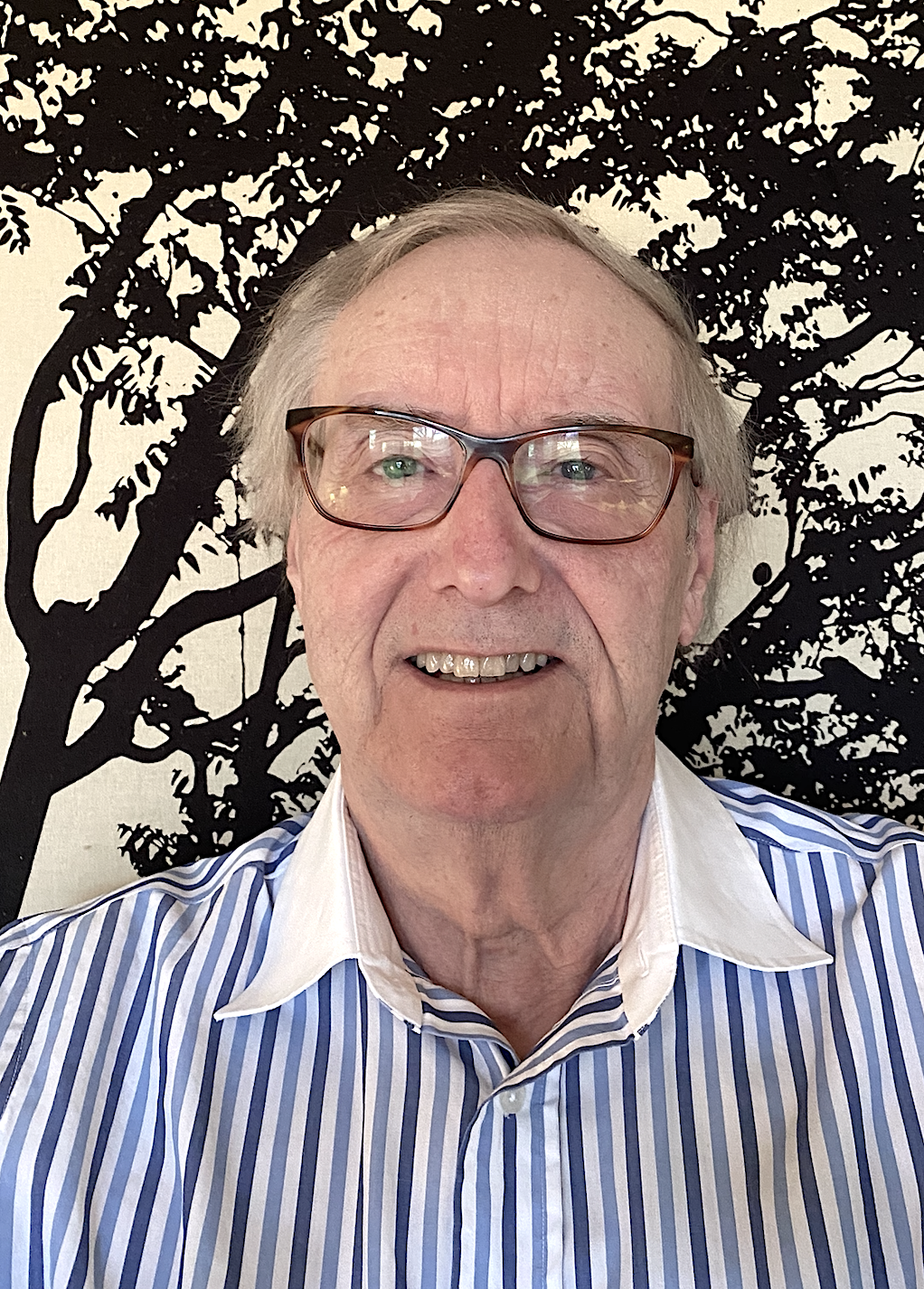
- Born: 1948 (age 77–78); London, England
- Citizenship: British
- Education: Bristol University (B.Sc. 1969); Sheffield University (Ph.D. 1972)
- Known for: NMR spectroscopy and drug discovery
- Awards: The Meldola Medal, Royal Society of Chemistry; The Colworth Medal, Biochemical Society; Award in Pure Chemistry, American Chemical Society; Award in Spectroscopy, Royal Society of Chemistry; Award in Soft Matter and Biophysical Chemistry, Royal Society of Chemistry; Avanti Award in Lipids, Biophysical Society; Katz Basic Science Prize, American Heart Association
- Scientific career
- Fields: Physical chemistry, chemical biology, microbiology, parasitology
- Workplaces: University of Illinois at Urbana-Champaign
- Thesis: Spectroscopic Studies of Lipids and Biological Membranes (1972)
- Doctoral advisor: Dennis Chapman
- Other academic advisors: Jake MacMillan; Geoffrey Eglinton; Adam Allerhand; John S. Waugh

Eric Oldfield (born 1948) is an English chemist, the Harriet A. Harlin professor of chemistry and a professor of biophysics at the University of Illinois at Urbana-Champaign. He is known for his work in nuclear magnetic resonance spectroscopy of lipids, proteins and membranes; of inorganic solids; in computational chemistry, and in microbiology and parasitology. He has received a number of recognitions for his work, including the American Chemical Society's Award in Pure Chemistry, the Royal Society of Chemistry's Meldola Medal and the Biochemical Society's Colworth Medal. He is a member of the American Association for the Advancement of Science, a Fellow of the Royal Society of Chemistry and a Fellow of the American Physical Society.

== Early life and education ==
Oldfield was born in London, England on 23 May 1948. He attended Bristol University doing research with Jake MacMillan on diterpenes and Geoffrey Eglinton on lipids and isoprenoids. He graduated with a Bachelor of Science degree in 1969. He obtained a PhD in biophysical chemistry from the University of Sheffield in 1972, with Dennis Chapman, developing nuclear magnetic resonance methods to study lipid and membrane structure. He worked as a Research Associate and EMBO Postdoctoral Fellow at Indiana University with Adam Allerhand, on the development of high-resolution NMR of proteins (1972–1974) and was then a Visiting Scientist at MIT with John S. Waugh (1974-1975), working on solid-state NMR.

== Career ==
Oldfield joined the Department of Chemistry at the University of Illinois at Urbana-Champaign in 1975 as an assistant Professor of Chemistry. He was promoted to associate professor in 1980 and was a Professor from 1982 to 2002. He was then an Alumni Research Professor of Chemistry from 2003 to 2013 and since then has been the Harriet A. Harlin Professor of Chemistry. He has also been a professor of biophysics in the Center for Computational Biology and Biophysics since 1995 and was a Fellow in the Center for Advanced Study in 1979, a Richard G. and Carole J. Cline University Senior Scholar in 1995 and an Associate in the Center for Advanced Study in 2000. He has authored 450 publications and as of 2023, has an h-index of 104 with 35,000 citations, according to Google Scholar and holds nine issued patents from the United States Patent and Trademark Office.

== Research ==
Oldfield is known for his research in nuclear magnetic resonance (NMR) spectroscopy and drug discovery. His invention of deuterium and proton NMR methods led to new ways to study the structures of lipids and membranes; his carbon-13 NMR and quantum chemical developments led to new ways to investigate protein structures; his investigations of quadrupolar nuclei led to new research in materials science, geochemistry and catalysis, and his more recent research using NMR, computational and crystallographic methods has led to the development of new therapeutic approaches to treating both infectious diseases and cancer, targeting lipid biosynthesis.

=== NMR of lipids and membranes ===
In the 1970s and 1980s Oldfield developed ways to investigate lipid and membrane structure including the use of 2H nuclear magnetic resonance (NMR) spectroscopy of labelled compounds. This method enabled the determination of the static and dynamic structures of lipids, and how they interact with proteins and sterol molecules such as cholesterol. In addition, he developed 1H and 13C magic-angle sample-spinning methods to investigate lipid membranes without the need for isotopic labeling. The magic-angle technique was not thought to be applicable to 1H NMR (due to strong dipolar interactions), but he showed that due to fast axial diffusion, these interactions were scaled and that remarkably high-resolution spectra could be obtained.

=== NMR of proteins ===
In the early 1970s, while working with Adam Allerhand, Oldfield reported the first high-resolution 13C NMR spectra of proteins—lysozyme, myoglobin and cytochrome c—in which numerous single carbon atom sites could be resolved and assigned. The origins of the chemical shift non-equivalencies observed due to folding remained unexplained until 1993 when he showed that 13C and 15N chemical shifts in proteins could be well predicted by using quantum chemical methods. He reasoned that since the chemical shift is essentially a local phenomenon, it might be possible to compute chemical shifts just by using small peptide fragments and a "locally dense" basis set, and this turned out to be correct. His early work also led to the demonstration that computed chemical shift tensors could be used in protein structure refinement. Moreover, he showed that the chemical shifts of non-native species in proteins such as 19F nuclei, could be also be computed, and were due to electric field effects.

=== Quantum chemistry ===
Followed by the observation that chemical shifts in proteins could be computed by using quantum chemical methods, Oldfield began a series of investigations of other spectroscopic properties including Mössbauer isomer shifts and quadrupole splittings, hyperfine shifts in metalloproteins, spin-spin couplings, and electric field gradients, as well as the effects of hydrogen bonding on chemical shifts.

=== NMR inorganic solids ===
Oldfield began to investigate structures of a variety of inorganic solids in the 1980s. He showed that high-resolution spectra of quadrupolar nuclei (such as 17O, 23Na) could be obtained by using variable-angle sample-spinning, spin echo, as well as spectral deconvolution methods. In his collaborative research with R. James Kirkpatrick, he investigated the 29Si magic-angle sample-spinning NMR spectra of a wide range of natural and synthetic silicates, showing that both Si-O bond length-chemical shift and bond strength-chemical shift relationships were useful tools for investigating the structures of crystalline silicates and, more importantly, silicate glasses, clays and zeolites that cannot be examined by single crystal X-ray or neutron diffraction methods. He also worked on investigating Pt/Ru direct methanol oxidation fuel cell catalysts using 13C and 195Pt NMR, in collaboration with A. Wieckowksi, which clarified the mechanism of enhanced CO tolerance in Pt/Ru versus pure Pt catalysts.

=== Antibiotics ===
In 1999, Oldfield shifted his research to more biomedical applications. Working in collaboration with Julio Urbina and Roberto Docampo, his group found, using 31P NMR spectroscopy, that the parasitic protozoan Trypanosoma cruzi, the causative agent of Chagas disease, contained very high levels of diphosphate, and that diphosphate analogs, bisphosphonates used clinically to treat bone resorption diseases, killed these parasites. as well as others. He also discovered that the bisphosphonate pamidronate cured mice of leishmaniasis and proposed that farnesyl diphosphate synthase (FPPS) can be used as the target of bisphosphonate drugs

Oldfield then discovered another compound that killed T. cruzi, the antiarrhythmic drug amiodarone, and that it acted synergistically with the azole drug posaconazole. He then began to investigate antibacterial agents. The human pathogen Staphylococcus aureus contains a gold-colored virulence factor called staphyloxanthin that protects the bacterium from killing by reactive oxygen species. Recognizing that the biosynthesis of the carotenoid pigment had similarities to the first steps in cholesterol biosynthesis, he synthesized a range of cholesterol biosynthesis inhibitors and tested them in S. aureus and in mice models of infection finding potent activity against the protein target dehydrosqualene synthase, the bacterium, and in a mice model of infection. His group also showed that some drugs and drug leads that target tuberculosis bacteria function as protonophore uncouplers and in some cases they can also target isoprenoid biosynthesis, leading to potent multi-target inhibition.

=== Anti-cancer drug leads ===
In 2012, Oldfield's group synthesized lipophilic analogs of the clinical bisphosphonate drugs zoledronate and risedronate, to prevent unwanted binding to bone mineral, and found they had potent anti-malarial activity. Additionally, they had potent activity in a combination therapy with rapamycin in tumor cells and in mice, by targeting protein prenylation with inhibition of protein prenylation also leading to activity as vaccine adjuvants. Mechanistically, FPPS inhibition affects cell signaling, but it also leads to accumulation of isopentenyl diphosphate and dimethylallyl diphosphate, compounds that activate γδT cells by binding to butyrophilins in target cells and this T cell activation led to tumor cell killing. His group also showed that some clinically used bisphosphonate drugs are converted to analogs of adenosine triphosphate that function by inhibiting cell signaling pathways.

=== Isoprenoid synthesis ===
Oldfield and his collaborators have reported the structures and mechanisms of action of many proteins involved in isoprenoid biosynthesis, focusing on the modular structures found. They successfully predicted the αβγ tri-domain found in diterpene cyclases. Furthermore, they used electron paramagnetic resonance and X-ray crystallography to develop the organometallic mechanism of action of the unusual 4Fe-4S proteins IspG and IspH involved in the early stages of isoprenoid biosynthesis, and also used X-ray methods for providing mechanisms of action for the terpene cyclases.

== Awards ==
- 1977 –The Meldola Medal, Royal Society of Chemistry
- 1980 – Katz Basic Science Research Prize, American Heart Association
- 1983 – The Colworth Medal, Biochemical Society
- 1984 – Award in Pure Chemistry, American Chemical Society
- 1995 – Award in Spectroscopy, Royal Society of Chemistry
- 2009 – Award in Soft Matter and Biophysical Chemistry, Royal Society of Chemistry
- 2011 – Avanti Award in Lipids, The Biophysical Society

== Selected articles ==
- M. D. Meadows, K. A. Smith, R. A. Kinsey, T. M. Rothgeb, R. P. Skarjune and E. Oldfield, Proc. Natl. Acad. Sci. U.S.A., 79, 1351–1355 (1982), High-resolution solid state NMR of quadrupolar nuclei
- J. Forbes, J. Bowers, L. Moran, X. Shan, E. Oldfield, and M. A. Moscarello, J. Chem. Soc., Faraday Transactions, 84, 3821–3849 (1988). Some new developments in solid-state nuclear magnetic resonance spectroscopic studies of lipids and biological membranes, including the effects of cholesterol in model and natural systems.
- A. C. de Dios, J. G. Pearson and E. Oldfield, Science, 260, 1491–1496 (1993). Secondary and tertiary structural effects on protein NMR chemical shifts: An ab initio approach.
- G. Benaim, J. M. Sanders, Y. Garcia-Marchán, C. Colina, R. Lira, A. R. Caldera, G. Payares, C. Sanoja, J. M. Burgos, A. Leon-Rossell, J. L. Concepcion, A. Schijman, M. Levin and E. Oldfield and J. A. Urbina, J. Med. Chem., 49, 892–899 (2006). Amiodarone has intrinsic anti-Trypanosoma cruzi activity and acts synergistically with posaconazole.
- C.-I. Liu, G. Y. Liu, Y. Song, F. Yin, M. E. Hensler, W.-Y. Jeng, V. Nizet, A. H.-J. Wang and E. Oldfield, Science, 319, 1391–1394 (2008). A cholesterol biosynthesis inhibitor blocks Staphylococcus aureus virulence.
- Y. Xia, N. Yeddula, M. Leblanc, E. Ke, Y. Zhang, E. Oldfield, R. J. Shaw and I. M. Verma, Nature Cell Biology, 14, 257–265 (2012). Reduced cell proliferation by IKK2/IKKb depletion in a mouse lung cancer model.
- W. Wang and E. Oldfield, Angew. Chem. Int. Ed. Engl., 53, 4294–4310 (2014). Bioorganometallic chemistry with IspG and IspH: structure, function, and inhibition of the [Fe4S4] proteins involved in isoprenoid biosynthesis.
- L. Yuan, X. Ma, Y. Yang, Y. Qu, X. Li, X. Zhu, W. Ma, J. Duan, J. Xue, H. Yang, J-W. Huang, S. Yi, M. Zhang, N. Cai, L. Zhang, Q. Ding, K. Lai, C. Liu, L. Zhang, X. Liu, Y. Yao, S. Zhou, X. Li, P. Shen, Q. Chang, S. R. Malwal, Y. He, W. Li, C. Chen, C-C. Chen, E. Oldfield, R-T. Guo, Y. Zhang. Nature. 2023 Sep; 621(7980): 840–848. Phosphoantigens glue butyrophilin 3A1 and 2A1 to activate Vγ9Vδ2 T cells.
