= Sophie G. Martin =

Swiss biologist

Sophie Martin
- Born: Sophie Geneviève Elisabeth Martin
- Education: University of Lausanne; University of Cambridge
- Spouse: Richard Benton
- Awards: EMBO Gold Medal (2014); EMBO Member (2020)
- Scientific career
- Fields: Cell polarity Cell fusion Cytoskeleton; Cell cycle
- Workplaces: Columbia University; University of Lausanne
- Thesis: Molecular and genetic analysis of cell polarisation, mRNA localisation and axis formation during Drosophila oogenesis (2002)
- Website: wp.unil.ch/martinlab/lab-members/sophie-martin/

Sophie Geneviève Elisabeth Martin Benton is a Swiss biologist who is Professor and Director of the Department of Fundamental Microbiology at the University of Lausanne. Her research investigates the molecular processes that underpin cellular fusion. She was awarded the EMBO Gold Medal in 2014.

== Early life and education ==
Martin was an undergraduate student at the University of Lausanne, where she studied the organisation of chromatin with Susan M. Gasser. She was based in the Swiss Institute for Experimental Cancer Research. After graduating, Martin joined Daniel St Johnston at the University of Cambridge, where she investigated the molecular mechanism of cell polarisation and the localisation of mRNA. She earned her PhD in 2002.

== Research and career ==
Martin moved to Columbia University, where she worked on cell polarisation and fission. In 2007, Martin returned to the University of Lausanne, where she was made a Swiss National Science Foundation Professor at the Center for Integrative Genomics. She was promoted to full Professor in 2018.

Martin was awarded a European Research Council Consolidator Grant to study cellular fusion. The fusion of cells is critical in fertilisation and development, and influences the formation of bone, tissue regeneration and cancer. Such fusion requires communication between cells, followed by polarisation, self-assembly and membrane juxtaposition. Her ERC Consolidator grant was focused on cellular fusion in Schizosaccharomyces pombe, a simple yeast model. The cells are haploids and fuse to form a diploid zygote. Martin studies the communication between cells and the mechanisms that underpin actin fusion focus formation.

=== Awards and honours ===
- 2010 European Research Council starting grant
- 2012 American Society for Cell Biology Women in Cell Biology Award
- 2014 EMBO Gold Medal
- 2014 Friedrich Miescher Award
- 2017 SNF Bonus of Excellence
- 2020 Elected a member of the European Molecular Biology Organization (EMBO)
- 2021 European Research Council (ERC) advanced grant

== Personal life ==
Martin is married to biologist Richard Benton.
