= Hideki Shirakawa =

Japanese chemist and engineer (1936–2026)

- 白川 英樹
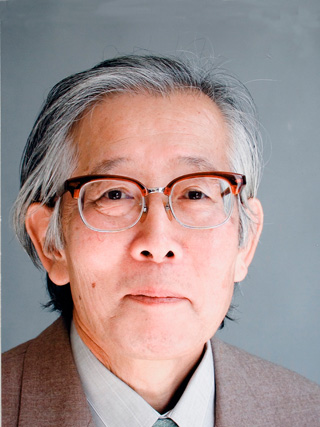
- Shirakawa in 2001
- Born: August 20, 1936; Tokyo, Japan
- Died: August 24, 2026 (aged 90); Yokohama, Japan
- Education: Tokyo Institute of Technology (now Institute of Science Tokyo)
- Known for: Conductive polymers
- Awards: Nobel Prize in Chemistry (2000); Person of Cultural Merit (2000); Order of Culture (2000)
- Scientific career
- Fields: Chemistry
- Workplaces: Tokyo Institute of Technology; University of Pennsylvania; University of Tsukuba

Hideki Shirakawa (白川 英樹, Shirakawa Hideki; August 20, 1936 – August 24, 2026) was a Japanese chemist and engineer who was Professor Emeritus at the University of Tsukuba and Zhejiang University. He was best known for his discovery of conductive polymers. He was co-recipient of the 2000 Nobel Prize in Chemistry jointly with Alan MacDiarmid and Alan Heeger.

== Early life and education ==
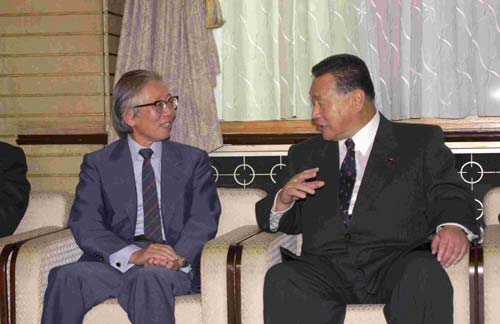
Shirakawa with Yoshirō Mori (at the Prime Minister's Official Residence on October 18, 2000)

Hideki Shirakawa was born in Tokyo, Japan, on August 20, 1936, the second son of a military doctor. He was the third of five children. Olympic marathoner champion Naoko Takahashi is his second cousin-niece. He lived in Manchukuo and Taiwan during childhood. Around third grade, he moved to Takayama, Gifu, which is the hometown of his mother.

Shirakawa graduated from the Tokyo Institute of Technology (Tokyo Tech) with a bachelor's degree in chemical engineering in 1961, and also pursued his master's and doctorate degrees with polymer chemist Shu Kambara as his supervisor, earning a Doctor of Engineering in 1966. Afterward, he obtained the post of assistant in the Chemical Resources Laboratory at Tokyo Tech.

== Career ==
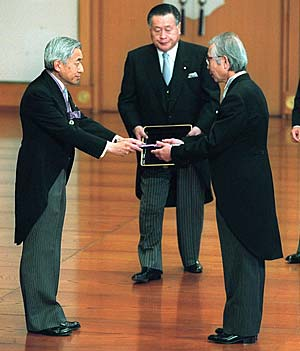
Emperor Akihito conferred the Order of Culture on Shirakawa (at the Imperial Palace on November 3, 2000)

While working as a research associate at the Tokyo Institute of Technology (Tokyo Tech), Shirakawa studied the synthesis of polyacetylene using Ziegler–Natta catalysts. Earlier preparations of the polymer had produced an insoluble black powder that was difficult to study. In the autumn of 1967, a visiting researcher in his group, Hyung Chick Pyun, used roughly a thousand times more catalyst than intended, apparently because a millimolar quantity was read as molar; Shirakawa later said he could not recall whether the error lay in his instructions or in how they were read. The rapid reaction produced ragged fragments of film instead of the usual powder; by systematically varying the conditions, Shirakawa established that the catalyst concentration was the decisive factor in forming the film, which had a silvery, metallic lustre. He developed this into a controlled method for making polyacetylene films, in which the reaction temperature determined the proportion of cis and trans isomers. Despite its metallic appearance, the film was not a good electrical conductor.

The film caught the attention of Alan MacDiarmid, a chemist at the University of Pennsylvania who, with the physicist Alan Heeger, had been studying the metallic-looking inorganic polymer polythiazyl, (SN)_{x}; the two met by chance during a coffee break at a seminar MacDiarmid gave in Tokyo. MacDiarmid invited Shirakawa to the University of Pennsylvania, where he spent a year from September 1976. On 23 November 1976, while measuring the conductivity of a polyacetylene film with C. K. Chiang, a postdoctoral fellow in Heeger's group, Shirakawa observed that adding bromine increased it about ten million times. The group went on to show that oxidizing polyacetylene with halogens such as chlorine, bromine or iodine, a process they called doping by analogy with semiconductors, could raise its electrical conductivity by a factor of up to about a billion, higher than any polymer known at the time. Heeger, MacDiarmid, and Shirakawa were awarded the 2000 Nobel Prize in Chemistry "for the discovery and development of conductive polymers". The conduction mechanism is described by the Su–Schrieffer–Heeger model, in which charge is carried by solitons; after returning to Japan, Shirakawa's spectroscopic studies linked the conductivity of iodine-doped polyacetylene to positively charged solitons.

In November 1979, Shirakawa moved to the Institute of Materials Science at the University of Tsukuba as an associate professor, and he was promoted to full professor in October 1982. At Tsukuba he developed methods for synthesizing oriented polyacetylene films using liquid crystals as the solvent, and later helical polyacetylene using chiral nematic liquid crystals. He chaired the Master's School in Sciences and Engineering of the Graduate School from April 1991 to March 1993, and served as Provost of the Third Cluster of Colleges from April 1994 to March 1997. He retired from the university at the end of March 2000. In November 2000, he was named a Person of Cultural Merit and received the Order of Culture.

== Death ==
On August 24, 2026, Shirakawa died at a hospital in Yokohama, Japan, at the age of 90.

== Research ==
According the University of Tsukuba's web page on Shirakawa, his research on conductive polymers can be broken down into four main categories: polyacetylene thin film synthesis, the causation of metallic conductivity due to chemical doping, the creation of conjugated (double or triple bonds in a molecule which are separated by a single bond) liquid crystalline polymers, and acetylene polymerization development that used liquid crystals as solvents.

1. Polyacetylene Synthesis: Polyacetylene was expected to have certain properties, with insolubility making the substance difficult to work with. Dr. Shirakawa found that polyacetylene thin films can be synthesized, and with the thin films, the doctor clarified the molecular and solidified structures of polyacetylene.
2. Creation of Metallic Conductivity: Dr. Shirakawa found that, when a trace of a halogen such as bromine or iodine is added to thin film polyacetylene, its electric conductivity increases, and it exhibits metallic conductivity. Shirakawa found that partial electron transfer between dopants and p-electrons of polyacetylene can generate metallic conductivity.
3. Using Liquid Crystals to Develop Acetylene Polymerization: Dr. Shirakawa developed a method for the production of highly conductive polyacetylene thin films which paralleled the polymerization of acetylene. Furthermore, he succeeded in the synthesis of thin films of helical polyacetylene whose chirality is controllable.
4. Creation of Conjugated Liquid Crystalline Polymers: Dr. Shirakawa created self-oriented, conjugated liquid crystalline polymers by introducing liquid crystalline groups into the side chains of p-conjugated polymers such as polyacetylene. He also macroscopically oriented the polymers with electric or magnetic fields and succeeded in having the molecules electric anisotropy.

The general definition of electrical anisotropy describes the variation of an electrical property depending on the lateral or vertical direction (x,y,z) in which a current flows.

== Recognition ==
- 1983 – The Award of the Society of Polymer Science, Japan
- 2000 – SPSJ Award for Outstanding Achievement in Polymer Science and Technology
- 2000 – Nobel Prize in Chemistry
- 2000 – Order of Culture and selected as Person of Cultural Merit
- 2000 – Professor Emeritus of the University of Tsukuba
- 2001 – Special Award of the Chemical Society of Japan
- 2001 – Member of the Japan Academy
- 2006 – Professor Emeritus of the Zhejiang University

=== The Nobel Prize ===
Shirakawa was awarded the 2000 Nobel Prize in Chemistry together with UPenn's physics professor Alan J. Heeger and chemistry professor Alan G. MacDiarmid, "for the discovery and development of conductive polymers". He also became the first Japanese Nobel laureate who did not graduate from one of the National Seven Universities and the second Japanese chemistry Nobel laureate.

Over the years, Shirakawa has expressed that he did not want the Nobel Prizes to receive too much special treatment from mass media (especially the Japanese media). He hoped that many vital areas in fields outside the Nobel Prize categories will also become more widely known.

== Relatives ==
One of his relatives, Hitomi Yoshizawa, is a member of the singing group Morning Musume Morning Girls. He is also related to Naoko Takahashi, the women's marathon gold medalist of the 2000 Summer Olympics.

== Public issues ==
On 6 December 2013, the House of Councillors (Japan) approved the bill of the State Secrecy Law. Shirakawa and physics Nobel laureate Toshihide Maskawa issued a statement saying that the law:

"threatens the pacifist principles and fundamental human rights established by the constitution and should be rejected immediately...(omitted)...Even in difficult times, protecting the freedom of the press, of thought and expression and of academic research is indispensable."

== See also ==
- List of Japanese Nobel laureates
