= Mariann Bienz =

British biologist

Mariann Bienz FRS FMedSci
- Born: 21 December 1953 (age 72); Winterthur, Switzerland
- Education: University of Zürich
- Spouse: Sir Hugh Pelham (m. 1996)
- Awards: FRS; FMedSci
- Scientific career
- Workplaces: Laboratory of Molecular Biology
- Website: www2.mrc-lmb.cam.ac.uk/group-leaders/a-to-g/mariann-bienz/

Mariann Bienz, Lady Pelham (born 21 December 1953, Winterthur) is a Swiss-British molecular biologist based at the UK Medical Research Council Laboratory of Molecular Biology. She has been a member of their Senior Scientific Staff since 1991, was Joint-head of Cell Biology in 2007-08 and has been a Group Leader of Protein and Nucleic Acid Chemistry Division since 2008.

== Education ==
She was educated at Gymnasium Winterthur and the University of Zürich where she studied Zoology and Molecular Biology and earned her PhD in 1981.

Her doctoral thesis, Informationelle Suppression bei Drosophila, was completed in 1981.

== Career and research ==
Bienz subsequently undertook postdoctoral research at the LMB and in 1986 returned to Zürich as assistant professor, and then (1990) associate professor also serving as a member of EMBO in 1989.

== Personal life ==
Married to biologist Sir Hugh Pelham since 1996.

== Awards and honours ==
- Member EMBO, 1989
- Friedrich Miescher Prize, Swiss Biochemical Society, 1990
- Fellow of the Royal Society (FRS), 2003
- Fellow of the Academy of Medical Sciences (FMedSci), 2006
