= List of fellows of the Royal Society elected in 2003 =

Fellows of the Royal Society elected in 2003.

== Fellows ==
1. John David Barrow
2. Susan Jocelyn Bell Burnell
3. Mariann Bienz
4. William Bonfield
5. John Milton Brown
6. Mark Wayne Chase
7. John Michael David Coey
8. Kay Elizabeth Davies
9. Anthony Dickinson
10. Eleanor Joy Dodson
11. Peter John Dornan
12. Ann Patricia Dowling
13. Jeffery Errington
14. Roger Fletcher
15. Roderick John Flower
16. Melvyn Francis Greaves
17. Peter James Green
18. Keith Gull
19. Peter William Harold Holland
20. James Hough
21. Malcolm Irving
22. Jonathan Dallas George Jones
23. Michael Lawrence Klein
24. Alan Graham MacDiarmid
25. Stephen Mann
26. Richard John Nelmes
27. Stephen Patrick O’Rahilly
28. Bridget Margaret Ogilvie
29. Timothy Noel Palmer
30. John C B Papaloizou
31. Venkatraman Ramakrishnan
32. Elizabeth Jane Robertson
33. John Gair Robson
34. John Donald Scott
35. Richard H. Sibson
36. Leon Melvyn Simon
37. Geoffrey Lilley Smith
38. Adrian Peter Sutton
39. Karen Heather Vousden
40. Andrew James Watson
41. Fiona Mary Watt
42. Peter Neil Temple Wells

== Foreign members ==
1. Denis Baylor
2. Fotis Constantine Kafatos
3. Klaus von Klitzing
4. Donald Ervin Knuth
5. José Sarukhán
6. Valentine Louis Telegdi
