= Terence Rabbitts =

British molecular immunologist

Terry Rabbitts
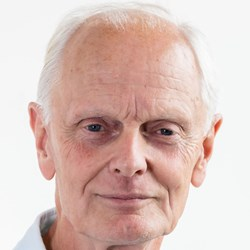
- Education: University of East Anglia; National Institute for Medical Research
- Awards: Colworth Medal (1981); FRS (1987); CIBA medal (1993); FMedSci (1998); Clotten Foundation Award (2015); FACCR (2022); FRCP (2024)
- Scientific career
- Fields: Molecular Biology & Molecular Immunology
- Workplaces: The Institute of Cancer Research; Weatherall Institute of Molecular Medicine; Leeds Institute of Molecular Medicine; MRC Laboratory of Molecular Biology
- Website: www.icr.ac.uk/our-research/researchers-and-teams/professor-terence-rabbitts www.orbitdiscovery.com

Terence Howard Rabbitts is Professor of Molecular Immunology at the Institute of Cancer Research, London.

== Education ==
He was educated at John Ruskin Grammar School, the University of East Anglia where he graduated with a BSc with first class honours in Biological Sciences, and subsequently completed his PhD at the National Institute for Medical Research, Mill Hill, London. supervised by Thomas Work (at NIMR) and by Ken Murray (at the University of Edinburgh) on mitochondrial nucleic acid homogeneity.

== Career & Research ==
At NIMR, he became interested in molecular immunology from Peter Medawar's work on immune tolerance. Following his PhD, he worked as a post-doctoral fellow in César Milstein's group at the MRC Laboratory of Molecular Biology (LMB) in Cambridge from 1973. He became a group leader at LMB in 1978 and succeeded Fred Sanger as joint Head of the Division of Protein and Nucleic Acid Chemistry at LMB in 1998, together with César Milstein and later with Sir Greg Winter. He was Director of the Leeds Institute of Molecular Medicine in 2007-2012 and moved to the University of Oxford to become Professor of Molecular Immunology at the MRC Weatherall Institute of Molecular Medicine. He has been Professor of Molecular Immunology in the Division of Cancer Therapeutics at the Institute of Cancer Research, London since 2020.

His contributions in biotechnology include chairing the Scientific Advisory Board of Cambridge Antibody Technology from its launch until its IPO, of Quadrant Healthcare until its acquisition by Elan, and of Kymab until its acquisition by Sanofi. He was an SAB member of Domantis until acquisition by GSK, and a Non-Executive Board member of Aptuscan until its acquisition by Avacta. He is a co-founder of three start-up companies, Orbit Discovery, Quadrucept Bio and Kodiform Therapeutics.

His research has focussed on antibody and T cell receptor gene diversity, gene rearrangement and aberrant rearrangement of chromosomes (chromosomal translocations) in cancer. He pioneered the method of cDNA cloning, an approach universally used in bioscience and biotechnology, and elucidated the organization, diversity and rearrangement of human antibody genes, which defined the building blocks for construction of therapeutic antibody repertoires. He also pioneered chimaeric antibodies (with the late Michael Neuberger). He discovered the LMO and HOX11 chromosomal translocation oncogene families in T cell leukaemia and the first fusion gene in a solid tumour. He developed the first knock-in gene, now a widely employed approach in gene targeting and gene editing. He also pioneered the design of intracellular antibody single domain fragments (iDAbs) and established approaches to develop these macromolecules (these he called macrodrugs) with warheads to induce cellular phenotypes. He has developed methods to select chemical compound surrogates using single domain intracellular antibody fragments as competitors. These methods have resulted in drug leads for the previously considered undruggable RAS proteins and the hard-to-drug translocation proteins LMO2. His methods allow the use of intracellular antibody fragments to select chemical compounds that bind to disordered proteins within cells. Since 2020, his laboratory work has been focussed on developing methods to deliver intracellular antibody fragments into cells as drugs per se and targeting fusion proteins made from chromosomal translocations.

== Awards and honours ==
He is a Fellow of the Royal Society, a Founder Fellow of the Academy of Medical Sciences, an EMBO Member and a Fellow of the American Association for Cancer Research Academy. He has been awarded the Colworth Medal, the CIBA prize and the Clotten Foundation Prize in recognition for his work on the diversity and rearrangement of human antibody genes, and on chromosomal translocation genes in cancer aetiology. He was elected as an Honorary Fellow of the Royal College of Physicians in 2024 for applying molecular biology to human disease and the development of new therapeutics.
