= Giulia Zanetti =

British-Italian biologist and academic

- Education: University of Sydney
- Scientific career
- Workplaces: Birkbeck, University of London; Francis Crick Institute; University of California, Berkeley
- Thesis: Virus structure studied by cryo-electron tomography and averaging (2009)

Giulia Zanetti is a British Italian biologist who is Professor of Molecular Biology at the Francis Crick Institute. She develops advanced imaging techniques to understand membrane transport pathways. She was awarded the 2021 Biochemical Society Colworth Medal.

== Early life and education ==
Zanetti was an undergraduate student in biomedical technologies. She moved to Australia for graduate studies, where she worked on HIV/AIDS at the University of Sydney. In 2004, Zanetti joined the University of Oxford, where she studied spike proteins on virus membranes. These spike proteins made it possible for viruses to enter cells. She developed cryo-electron tomography with "subtomogram averaging", a reconstruction approach that can be used to understand protein structures in situ. It works by aligning and averaging images of a large number of copies of flash-frozen samples, and can generate 3D images. She moved to the University of California, Berkeley for her postdoctoral research, where she worked alongside Randy Schekman and applied her electron microscopy knowledge to capsids.

== Research and career ==
Zanetti was part of the UCL – Birkbeck Institute of Structural and Molecular Biology. In 2021, she was awarded the Colworth Medal. She moved to the Francis Crick Institute in 2024.

Zanetti studies membrane transport pathways using Cryo-Electron Microscopy. She is particularly interested in the membrane transport pathways that control the secretion of collagen in animal cells. Despite its importance in human health, the organisation of the secretory pathway has remained unclear.

== Selected publications ==
- J. A. G. Briggs; J. D. Riches; B. Glass; V. Bartonova; G. Zanetti; H.-G. Kräusslich (22 June 2009). "Structure and assembly of immature HIV". Proceedings of the National Academy of Sciences of the United States of America. 106 (27): 11090–11095. Bibcode:2009PNAS..10611090B. doi:10.1073/pnas.0903535106. ISSN 0027-8424. PMC 2700151. PMID 19549863. Wikidata Q37237053.
- Giulia Zanetti; Kanika Bajaj Pahuja; Sean Studer; Soomin Shim; Randy Schekman (22 December 2011). "COPII and the regulation of protein sorting in mammals". Nature Cell Biology. 14 (1): 20–28. doi:10.1038/ncb2390. ISSN 1465-7392. PMID 22193160. Wikidata Q37970881.
- Giulia Zanetti; John A G Briggs; Kay Grünewald; Quentin J Sattentau; Stephen D Fuller (August 2006). "Cryo-electron tomographic structure of an immunodeficiency virus envelope complex in situ". PLOS Pathogens. 2 (8): e83. doi:10.1371/journal.ppat.0020083. ISSN 1553-7366. PMC 1557830. PMID 16933990. Wikidata Q21090535.
