= Jake MacMillan =

Scottish organic chemist (1924–2014)

Jake MacMillan FRS
- Born: John MacMillan; 13 September 1924; Wishaw, Lanarkshire, Scotland
- Died: 12 May 2014 (aged 89)
- Resting place: Pucklechurch, Gloucestershire, England
- Education: University of Glasgow (PhD)
- Known for: Properties and structures of griseofulvins and gibberellins
- Spouse: Anneliese (Anne) Levy (m. 1952)
- Children: 3
- Parent(s): John MacMillan; Barbara MacMillan (née Lindsay)
- Awards: See list
- Scientific career
- Fields: Plant hormones
- Institutions: Imperial Chemical Industries; University of Bristol; UCLA; Long Ashton Research Station
- Thesis: Synthesis of Colchicine Derivatives (1948)
- Doctoral advisor: J D Loudon

John MacMillan FRS (13 September 1924 – 12 May 2014), always known as Jake MacMillan, was a British scientist who worked at the interface between biology and chemistry. He "became renowned for his work on isolating, naming and determining the chemical structure of gibberellins, which regulate growth and influence processes such as stem elongation and germination".

== Biography ==
John MacMillan was born on 13 September 1924 in Wishaw, Lanarkshire, and lived there for his first 10 years. His father, John, like his grandfather, was a “signalman on the old London Midland and Scottish (LMS) railway line”, and his mother, Barbara (née Lindsay) came from a farming background. His parents, he and his younger brother lived in a two-room tenement, in which the ‘best’ room, as was the custom then, was never used, so the family essentially lived in a single room.

MacMillan gained a place in the top entry form at Lanark Grammar School. Here he became very interested in chemistry and entered the University of Glasgow in 1942, to read chemistry, natural philosophy and mathematics in the first year, and chemistry and botany in the second; he graduated in 1946 with first class honours. He went on to obtain a postgraduate studentship from the Department of Scientific and Industrial Research (DSIR), enabling him to continue as a PhD student in Glasgow. He worked on the structure of colchicine, and was supervised by Dr J.D. Loudon. The results were published in four papers.

=== Imperial Chemical Industries ===
After gaining his PhD in 1948, MacMillan was not attracted to academia, especially with its low salaries. Instead, “as luck would have it […] an ideal position with Imperial Chemical Industries (ICI) fell into my lap”. He joined a small, high-powered group of organic chemists and microbiologists at The Frythe in Welwyn, aiming to find potential pharmaceuticals in fungi. This resulted, inter alia, in the isolation from Penicillium spp. of the potent fungistatic agent griseofulvin.

MacMillan’s next project at ICI was on the plant hormones gibberellins, which were first known as fungal metabolites. In the 1950s the search began at the ICI Akers Research Labs to see if they existed in higher plants. A multidisciplinary team was involved in the effort, with Margaret Radley discovering that immature seeds of runner beans (Phaseolus multiflorus) were a relatively rich source (ca 0.25 μg/g). With the help of local growers about two metric tons of beans were processed, eventually yielding milligram quantities of Gibberellin A_{1} (GA_{1}) and Gibberellin A_{5} (GA_{5}). More gibberellins were to follow and their structures determined.

There was growing international interest in these compounds, and a Gordon Conference was organised in 1957, at which MacMillan presented a paper. On the same trip he met Robert Burns Woodward, flew to California to meet Bernie Phinney at Stanford, and then to New York to attend the 132nd Meeting of the American Chemical Society (ACS). MacMillan made a second trip to the USA in 1960, to attend the 138th ACS meeting in New York.

His final years at ICI were spent in overseeing the move of Akers staff to the newly-established Pharmaceutical Division at Alderley Edge, and the transfer of The Frythe to its new owners, Unilever. He did not enjoy this time away from research, and decided to apply for an academic post, despite the large cut in salary.

=== University of Bristol ===
Jake MacMillan was appointed a lecturer at Bristol in 1963. He and a colleague, Bob Binks, worked on the relatively new technique of gas chromatography (GC) in combination with mass spectrometry GC-MS to identify a range of gibberellins. The results were presented at the Sixth International Conference on Plant Growth Substances at Carleton University, Ottawa, in 1967, and published in 1969. There he met and developed a life-long collaboration with Nobutaka Takahashi, leading to several visits to Japan.

In 1978, Macmillan was elected into the fellowship of the Royal Society of London.

MacMillan became head of the Department of Organic Chemistry in 1983. Long-term funding from the Agricultural and Food Research Council (AFRC) eased the day-to-day running of the group. He formally retired in 1990 but was able to continue for another year, taking care not to interfere with the work of his successor Thomas J Simpson, FRS.

=== Long Ashton Research Station ===
Again with funding from AFRC, Jake MacMillan was able to take up research at Long Ashton Research Station “working at the bench and learning new methods in enzymology and molecular biology [and] for the first three years he spent six months each year in Bernie Phinney’s lab at UCLA”. He also wrote reviews and many papers in the period 1990-2004. Overall, he published about 400 papers.

In 2003 MacMillan returned to the School of Chemistry, University of Bristol, as Emeritus Professor and Senior Research Fellow.

== Awards and honours ==
- President of the International Plant Growth Substance Association (1973-1976)
- Flintoff Medal, Royal Society of Chemistry (1978)
- Elected Corresponding Member of the American Society of Plant Physiology (1978)
- Elected Fellow of the Royal Society (1978)
- Research Medal, International Plant Growth Substance Association (1982)
- Elected Distinguished Foreign Scholar of Mid-America Association of State Universities (1987)
- Elected Honorary Member of the Japanese Society for Chemical Regulation in Plants (1987)
- American Society of Plant Physiology, Charles Reid Barnes Award (1988)
- Royal Society of Chemistry Award in Natural Product Chemistry (1988)
- Royal Society of Chemistry Hugo-Muller Lecturership and Medal (1988-1989)
- Elected Honorary Member of the Botanical Society of America (1989)
- Wilson Baker Lecturer, University of Bristol (1990)
- Foreign Associate of the US National Academy of Sciences (1991)
- Pergamon Phytochemical Prize (1995)

== Family ==
John MacMillan married Anne Levy in 1952. They had three children: Susan Janet, Frances Margaret, and Andrew Martin.

Jake died on 12 May 2014 and was cremated in Pucklechurch, Gloucestershire.

Anneliese (Anne) Levy was born in 1925; her family were refugees from Germany in the mid-1930s. She studied for her PhD at The Frythe, where she and Jake met. After the move to Bristol, Anne worked as a biology teacher at the former Westwing School, Thornbury.
