= Anthony James Merrill Spencer =

British mathematician

Tony Spencer
- Born: Anthony James Merrill Spencer; 23 August 1929
- Died: 26 February 2008 (aged 78)
- Education: University of Cambridge; University of Keele; University of Birmingham (PhD)
- Awards: FRS (1987)
- Scientific career
- Workplaces: Brown University; University of Nottingham
- Thesis: The solution of plane plastic-elastic problems by relaxation methods, with applications to the theory of brittle fracture (1955)
- Doctoral advisor: Ian Sneddon

Anthony James Merrill Spencer (23 August 1929 — 26 January 2008) FRS was an applied mathematician whose main field of research was in understanding and predicting the mechanical behaviour of advanced materials.

== Awards and honours ==
Spencer was elected a Fellow of the Royal Society (FRS) in 1987.
