= Markus Ralser =

Italian biologist

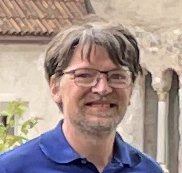
- Markus Ralser, 2022
- Born: 3 April 1980 (age 46)
- Education: University of Salzburg; Max Planck Institute for Molecular Genetics; University of Cambridge
- Awards: Wellcome Beit Prize; EMBO Gold Medal
- Scientific career
- Fields: Metabolism
- Workplaces: University of Cambridge; Francis Crick Institute; Charité; University of Oxford
- Website: ralser.group

Markus Ralser (born 3 April 1980 in Vipiteno, Italy) is an Italian biologist. His main research interest is metabolism of microorganisms. He is also known for his work on the origin of metabolism during the origin of life, and proteomics.

== Life and career ==
Prof. Ralser serves since 2019 as head of the Institute of Biochemistry at the Charité – Universitätsmedizin Berlin, Germany; as well as since 2022 as group leader at the University of Oxford, UK.

He studied genetics and molecular biology in Salzburg, Austria. He completed his PhD in 2006 at the Max Planck Institute for Molecular Genetics in Berlin, Germany, studying neurodegenerative diseases. This was followed by a postdoctoral fellowship at the Vrije Universiteit Amsterdam, Netherlands, where he started to explore mass spectrometry. He returned to the MPI for Molecular Genetics in 2007 to become junior group leader, but in 2011 relocated his group to the University of Cambridge, UK. He relocated again, becoming group leader at the newly opened Francis Crick Institute in London in 2013 (senior group leader since 2019). His group moved to Oxford in 2022.

== Research ==
Ralser's two research groups use LC–MS to analyze the proteomes and metabolomes of microorganisms. The main model organism is the baking yeast (Saccharomyces cerevisiae), but other species, such as pathogenic fungus Candida albicans and the fission yeast Schizosaccharomyces pombe, are used too.

His lab not only uses LC–MS, but also develops novel LC–MS methods and protocols that improve detection accuracy, speed, and throughput. Specializing in data-independent acquisition, the group has developed scanning SWATH MS and Zeno SWATH MS in collaboration with MS manufacturer SCIEX. Both methods greatly improve upon SWATH MS, which was developed in Switzerland in 2012. The group additionally developed an acquisition method—DIA-NN—that uses neural networks. But proteins and metabolites are not the only focus: in 2022 the lab developed a protocol for the accurate quantification of DNA methylation using LC–MS.

Key research topics include:

- Metabolic networks within cells.
- The exchange of metabolites between cells. The group found that yeast cells prefer to take up metabolites from the outside environment (the exometabolome) rather than produce their own, and that these cells can survive non-autonomously in a community, thus mutually depending on other community members for survival.
- The biochemistry of competing reactions within cells. The group generated a genome-scale enzyme-inhibition network in humans and revealed that compartmentalization in eukaryotes helps alleviate the extent of the self-inhibition.
- The role, function, and regulation of metabolic genes. This is achieved by analyzing the proteome and metabolome in a genome-wide collection of yeast gene deletion strains.
- Microbial cytogenetics. The group found that aneuploidy (abnormal chromosome number) is tolerated in yeast through a mechanism of dosage compensation: the expression of genes on aneuploid chromosomes is adjusted so as to produce a normal amount of protein.
- Metabolism-related protective mechanisms against oxidative stress. The group found, among others, that methionine, a known antioxidant, protects against oxidative stress through the pentose phosphate pathway. Earlier, Ralser found that cells dynamically switch between glycolysis and the pentose phosphate pathway to supply the antioxidant machinery with electrons—a mechanism known as the glycolysis/pentose phosphate pathway transition, which is now considered the first-line cellular anti-stress mechanism across species.
- The evolution of central carbon metabolism, and non-enzymatic reactions in cellular metabolism. The group found that key reactions of glycolysis, the pentose phosphate pathway, and gluconeogenesis can occur spontaneously, without enzyme catalysis, and in the ambient conditions that prevailed billions of years ago on Earth.
- Metabolic mechanisms of resistance to antifungal drugs.

During the COVID-19 pandemic the Ralser group developed a proteomics panel assay for the assessment of disease severity and for the prediction of outcome. The assay quantifies 50 peptides derived from 30 proteins found in a patient's blood plasma. The lab found that these proteins can serve as markers: their abundance strongly correlates with COVID-19 severity and outcome. The assay can be performed at a routine clinical laboratory, and has become commercially available.

As of January 2025, Ralser has published more than 200 peer-reviewed articles that have been cited more than 25,000 times.

== Awards ==
- BioMed Central Research Award, Biology (2007)
- Wellcome Beit Prize (2011)
- South Tyrolean Science Award (2014)
- Colworth Medal of the Biochemical Society, UK (2017)
- Starling Medal of the Endocrinological Society, UK (2019)
- EMBO Gold Medal (2020)
- Academia Europaea Sydney Brenner Medal, (2025)
