= Systems pharmacology =

Systems pharmacology is the application of systems biology principles to the field of pharmacology. It seeks to understand how drugs affect the human body as a single complex biological system. Instead of considering the effect of a drug to be the result of one specific drug-protein interaction, systems pharmacology considers the effect of a drug to be the outcome of the network of interactions a drug may have. In 1992, an article on systems medicine and pharmacology was published in China. Networks of interaction may include chemical-protein, protein–protein, genetic, signalling and physiological interactions (at cellular, tissue, organ and whole body levels). Systems pharmacology uses bioinformatics and statistics techniques to integrate and interpret these networks.

Systems pharmacology can be applied to drug safety studies as a complement to pharmacoepidemiology.

== See also ==
- Quantitative Systems Pharmacology
- Drug interaction

== PhD programs ==
- PharMetrX: Pharmacometrics & Computational Disease Modelling (annual call for applications, July - Sept 15th)
