= Matthew Johnson (plant biologist) =

Reader in biochemistry, University of Sheffield, England

Matthew Johnson is a Reader in biochemistry at the University of Sheffield, England. He was the 2018 recipient of the Biochemical Society’s Colworth Medal.

Johnson is a plant biologist focusing on photosynthesis and respiration. Through his research and development, he has discovered "novel plastoquinone diffusion nanodomains facilitating electron transport between photosystem II and cytochrome b6f complexes in spinach thylakoid membranes." In 2016, he received the Society of Experimental Biology's President's Medals for his research on the molecular machinery of photosynthesis. This was regarded as a revolutionary new way to view the way plants use solar energy to influence their growth, giving earth its food and oxygen.
