= Matthew S. Johnson =

American atmospheric chemistry scientist

Matthew Johnson
- Born: 14 December 1966; Crookston, Minnesota, USA
- Education: California Institute of Technology, Caltech Macalester CollegeOwatonna High School
- Alma mater: Caltech
- Occupations: Academic, Entrepreneur

Matthew Stanley Johnson (born 14 December 1966) is an American atmospheric chemistry scientist at the Department of Chemistry at the University of Copenhagen. Johnson has made contributions to several areas of chemistry, including kinetics, spectroscopy, isotope effects and application of atmospheric chemistry knowledge to air pollution control systems.

Johnson studied chemistry at Macalester College, Saint Paul, Minnesota. In 1995, he was awarded a PhD in Chemistry for his thesis Spectroscopy of Reactive Molecules and Clusters by the California Institute of Technology, Caltech.

After working at Bridgeman's, the Boy Scouts of America, Honeywell, Medtronic and Caltech he was awarded Fulbright Fellowship for research at the MAX-Lab accelerator at the Swedish University of Lund, and in 1998 became an assistant professor at the University of Copenhagen. In the field of kinetics he coordinates the Nordic Network for Chemical Kinetics (NoNeCK), he has twelve filed patents and over 140 publications in international peer-reviewed scientific journals. In 2012, Johnson and Harnung published their book titled "Chemistry and the Environment". Johnson has helped establish a series of clean tech companies including Infuser, Airlabs, Rensair, DevLabs, AirScape, Ambient Carbon and Luper Tech.

== Selected publications ==
- Johnson, M. S., Kuwata, K. T., Wong, C. K., & Okumura, M. (1996). Vibrational spectrum of I−(H2O). Chemical Physics Letters, 260(5-6), 551-557.
- Ueno, Y., Johnson, M. S., Danielache, S. O., Eskebjerg, C., Pandey, A., & Yoshida, N. (2009). Geological sulfur isotopes indicate elevated OCS in the Archean atmosphere, solving faint young sun paradox. Proceedings of the National Academy of Sciences, 106(35), 14784-14789.
- Schmidt, J. A., Johnson, M. S., & Schinke, R. (2013). Carbon dioxide photolysis from 150 to 210 nm: Singlet and triplet channel dynamics, UV-spectrum, and isotope effects. Proceedings of the National Academy of Sciences, 110(44), 17691-17696.
- Lynggaard, C., Bertelsen, M. F., Jensen, C. V., Johnson, M. S., Frøslev, T. G., Olsen, M. T., & Bohmann, K. (2022). Airborne environmental DNA for terrestrial vertebrate community monitoring. Current Biology, 32(3), 701-707.
- Li, Q., Meidan, D., Hess, P., Añel, J.A., Cuevas, C.A., Doney, S., Fernandez, R.P., van Herpen, M., Höglund-Isaksson, L., Johnson, M.S. and Kinnison, D.E., 2023. Global environmental implications of atmospheric methane removal through chlorine-mediated chemistry-climate interactions. Nature Communications, 14(1), p. 4045.
