= Quantitative systems pharmacology =

Quantitative systems pharmacology (QSP) is a mechanistic modeling approach within biomedical research that uses mathematical computer models to integratively characterize biological systems, disease processes and drug pharmacology. QSP can be viewed as a sub-discipline of pharmacometrics that focuses on modeling the mechanisms of drug pharmacokinetics (PK), pharmacodynamics (PD), and disease processes using a systems pharmacology point of view. QSP models are typically defined by systems of ordinary differential equations (ODE) that depict the dynamical interactions between drugs and biological systems, though other computational methods may also be employed.

QSP can be used to generate biological/pharmacological hypotheses in silico to aid in the design of in vitro or in vivo non-clinical and clinical experiments. This can help to guide biomedical experiments so that they yield more meaningful data. QSP is increasingly being used for this purpose in pharmaceutical research & development to help guide the discovery and development of new therapies. QSP has been used by the FDA in a clinical pharmacology review.

== Origin ==
QSP emerged as a discipline through two workshops held at the National Institutes of Health (NIH) in 2008 and 2010, with the goal of merging of systems biology and pharmacology. The workshops outlined a need for a mathematical discipline to aid in translational medicine. QSP proposed integrating concepts, methods, and investigators from computational biology, systems biology, and biological engineering into pharmacology.

A review of the history and future of QSP identified areas where it has advanced understanding of drug mechanisms, supported preclinical to clinical translation, and in general aided in drug development. The FDA has included QSP as a component of the Model-Informed Drug Development Program.
