= Peter Downes =

British biochemist

Sir Pete Downes OBE FMedSci FRSE

Principal and Vice-Chancellor of the University of Dundee
- In office 2009–2018
- Chancellor: The Lord Patel of Dunkeld; Dame Jocelyn Bell Burnell
- Rector: Craig Murray; Brian Cox; Mark Beaumont
- Preceded by: Sir Alan Langlands
- Succeeded by: Andrew Atherton

Personal details
- Born: 15 October 1953 (age 72) Manchester, England
- Education: University of Birmingham
- Profession: Biochemist
- Institutions: University of Birmingham University of Cambridge University of Dundee

Sir Charles Peter Downes OBE FMedSci FRSE (born 15 October 1953), known as Pete Downes, is a British biochemist and chairman of Dynamic Earth in Edinburgh. Downes served as Principal and Vice-Chancellor of the University of Dundee from 2009 until 2018. He is the former Head of the College of Life Sciences and co-founder of the Division of Signal Transduction Therapy (DSTT) alongside Sir Phillip Cohen. Having contributed to research in the pharmaceutical industry for eleven years prior to joining Dundee, he is one of the top 15 most cited bio-scientists in the UK.

== Career ==
As a pioneering biochemist, Downes was instrumental in establishing the biological importance of the inositol glycerophospholipids and their metabolites. Among his other discoveries are the identification of the mechanism of action for the drug lithium, which has since been used in the treatment of bipolar disorder, and the breakthrough in finding the biochemical pathway that is the most common source of mutations leading to human cancers. As a result of this work, many new avenues have opened up into the discovery of new drugs and to deeper levels of understanding regarding many common diseases.

In his capacity as Principal he has focused on fostering research links between academia and industry particularly in his own field of life sciences; his tenure has however seen financial challenges following Government cutbacks in funding. As former Convenor of Universities Scotland, Downes has spoken out against the UK's decision to exit the European Union citing the potential adverse effect on research funding and freedom of movement for staff and students. Downes was knighted in the Queen's 2015 Birthday Honours, "For services to Higher Education and Life Sciences."

In February 2018 it was announced by the University of Dundee that Professor Downes would retire as Principal at the end of the year. In explaining his decision he stated that as he would turn 65 later in the year it seemed to be "a natural time to consider the next stage of my life." It was announced on 2 July 2018 that Sir Pete would be succeeded as Principal and Vice-Chancellor by Professor Andrew Atherton on 1 January 2019. Following the end of his term at Dundee, Downes was appointed chairman of Dynamic Earth in March 2019, the geology-based visitor attraction in Holyrood, Edinburgh.

== Honours and awards ==
- 1987 Colworth Medal of the British Biochemical Society
- 1991 Fellow of the Royal Society of Edinburgh
- 2004 Officer of the Order of the British Empire
- 2009 Fellow of the Academy of Medical Sciences
- 2015 Knight Bachelor
