= School of Life Sciences (University of Dundee) =

- Parent institution: University of Dundee
- Dean: Paul Davies/Mike Ferguson (Interim Deans 2024/5)
- Location: Dundee, Scotland
- Website: https://www.dundee.ac.uk/life-sciences

The School of Life Sciences at the University of Dundee conducts research into the molecular and cellular mechanisms underlying human health and disease.

== History ==
Life Sciences research at the university began within the Department of Physiology. Following a campaign by Robert P. Cook who was a lecturer in Physiological Chemistry, the Department of Biochemistry was formed in 1965.... In 1970, the University of Dundee appointed Peter Garland CBE as its first Chair of Biochemistry based within the Department. Peter's arrival coincided with the opening of the Medical Sciences Institute (MSI) and Biological Sciences Institute (BSI) that provided up to date facilities for research to take place. The Department of Biochemistry moved from a converted stable block into the MSI alongside the Department of Anatomy and Physiology. In 1971, Peter recruited Sir Philip Cohen to Dundee, where he has remained ever since and who has played an instrumental role in the expansion of life sciences research in Dundee. The growth of the department was supported by Principal Adam Neville who redirected funds from other areas of the university. Peter had the ethos of employing the best is required to achieve the best, a strategy that exists to this day. Alongside his appointment of Philip, Peter also recruited David Lilley, Grahame Hardie and Chris Higgins. Further key appointments continued, this time led by Graham Warren; Peter's successor. In 1989, the Cancer Research Campaign supported the establishment of laboratories for David Glover, Birgitt Lane and David Lane. In 1990, the Medical Research Council set up the Protein Phosphorylation Unit which still exists today as the MRC Protein Phosphorylation and Ubiquitylation Unit (MRC PPU).

=== Expansion of research facilities ===
In 1994, the Wellcome Trust awarded £10 million to build the Wellcome Trust Biocentre which opened in 1997 and allowed further expansion in the research with several key appointments. As part of the fundraising efforts for this building, Sir Philip Cohen received a donation from Sir Sean Connery that came from part of his salary for his role in the 1991 film Robin Hood Prince of Thieves. A room in the building was named in his honour. The building originally housed the Divisions of Gene expression, Molecular Cell Biology and Molecular Parasitology that were affiliated with the Department of Biochemistry, while the Division of Cell and Development Biology was affiliated with the Department of Anatomy and Physiology. In 2007, the Sir James Black Centre (initially named the Centre for Interdisciplinary Research) was opened. It was named after the Nobel Prize winning Scottish pharmacologist and former University of Dundee Chancellor, Sir James W. Black. In 2008, Cohen established the Scottish Institute of Life Sciences (SCILLS) and in 2012, the MRC PPU expanded its remit to include SCILLS under the Directorship of Dario Alessi. Finally, in 2014 under the leadership of Sir Mike Ferguson, the Discovery Centre for Translational and Interdisciplinary Research was opened by Paul Nurse

Undergraduate teaching is currently based in the Carnelley Building on City Campus. The building is named after Thomas Carnelley, the first Professor of Chemistry in Dundee. It is also home to the D'Arcy Thompson Zoology Museum.

Plant Sciences research used to be based in the BSI building but following its closure, the division of Plant Sciences moved to the James Hutton Institute, Invergowrie as part of a partnership agreement with the institute. The BSI building was demolished in 2017 and the site is now a University allotment and garden

=== Changing name ===
The College of Life Sciences was formed on 1 August 2006 with Pete Downes as Vice Principal and Head of College. Sir Philip Cohen was named Director of Research and Dean of Life Sciences (Research). The college comprised the following research divisions: Biological Chemistry and Molecular Biology; Cell Biology and Immunology; Gene Regulation and Expression; Cell and Developmental Biology; Molecular Physiology; Environmental and Applied Biology; MRC Protein Phosphorylation and CRUK Nucleic Acid Research Group. Teaching was led by Life Sciences (Learning and Teaching). In 2015, following University restructuring the college became known as the School of Life Sciences and in April 2016, Julian Blow became Dean of the School of Life Sciences.

== Research ==
The school contains a number of different divisions, centres and units which address different research themes:

- Biological Chemistry and Drug Discovery
- Cell and Developmental Biology
- Cell Signalling and Immunology
- Computational Biology
- Drug Discovery Unit
- Gene Regulation and Expression
- Geomicrobiology Group
- Medical Research Council Protein Phosphorylation and Ubiquitylation Unit
- Molecular Microbiology
- Nucleic Acid Structure Research Group
- Plant Sciences (based in Invergowrie at the James Hutton Institute)
- Wellcome Centre for Anti-Infectives Research

== Teaching ==
Undergraduate teaching focusses on two degree streams, Biological and Biomedical Sciences. The D'Arcy Thompson Unit (DTU); named after Sir D'Arcy Wentworth Thompson, first Professor of Biology at Dundee; encompasses all School of Life Sciences staff based at the Carnelley Building on city campus. This building is home to biological and biomedical sciences undergraduate teaching. The DTU work closely with academic staff in the School of Life Sciences research divisions and in the School of Medicine.

=== Rankings ===
In recent University Guides, Biological Sciences and Biosciences at the university has been rated in the top 10 for those subjects:

- 3rd (Complete University Guide, 2020)
- 4th (Times/Sunday Times Good University Guide, 2019)
- 6th (Guardian University Guide, 2019)

=== Internationalisation ===
The school has forged partnerships with Xiamen University, China, National University Singapore and Central South University, China.

== Reputation ==
In 2003, an international survey of life scientists by the journal The Scientist named the School the third-best place to work outside the US. In 2011, the College of Life Sciences won the award for the 'Greatest delivery of impact' from the Biotechnology and Biological Sciences Research Council (BBSRC).

The school contributes to many of the accolades awarded to the university. These include:

- Top University in the UK for the quality of our Biological Sciences research (Research Excellence Framework, 2014)
- The only UK University ranked in the world top 50 of the 2017 Nature Innovation Index
- Ranked number 1 in the world in influencing pharmaceuticals (Clarivate Analytics, 2017)

=== Commercialisation ===
In 1998, Sir Philip Cohen and Peter Downes founded the Division of Signal Transduction Therapy (DSTT). The DSTT is a collaboration between the commercial pharmaceutical industry and an academic research institute. Over the last 20 years, the collaboration has attracted £60million of investment and helped accelerate the development of numerous drugs.

In 2006, Mike Ferguson and Alan Fairlamb established the Drug Discovery Unit (DDU) to address the unmet need for developing drugs against Neglected Tropical Diseases such as Leishmaniasis, Chagas' Disease and African Sleeping Sickness. Working in partnership with industry the Unit has developed pre-clinical drug candidates for malaria and visceral leishmaniasis. These findings were published in the journal Nature. The candidate for malaria is now in first in man clinical trials.

Scientists from the school have been responsible for the formation of a number of spin-out companies (and the attraction of spin-in and start-up companies). Examples include Cyclacel, Exscientia, Glencoe Software, Platinum Informatics and Ubiquigent.

=== Public engagement ===
The School holds a Gold Engage Watermark from the National Co-ordinating Centre for Public Engagement (NCCPE). The first faculty in the UK to do so

=== Athena SWAN ===
The school was awarded in October 2018 a Silver Athena SWAN award under the extended charter.

== Notable alumni ==
Through its many incarnations over the years, many notable scientists have conducted research in Dundee. Notable faculty alumni include (dates in brackets refer to their time as faculty researchers in Dundee):

- Geoffrey Dutton FRSE (1957 - 1975)
- Chris Higgins (1981 - 1989)
- Graham Warren (1985 - 1988)
- Steve Homans (1988 - 1994)
- David Glover (1989 - 1999)
- Sir David Lane (1989 - 2009)
- Birgitte Lane FRSE FMedSci (1989 - 2009)
- Cheryll Tickle (1998 - 2007)
- Sir Pete Downes OBE FMedSci FRSE (1989 - 2009)
- Tracy Palmer FRS FRSE (2007 - 2018)
