= Andrew Atherton (professor) =

British academic administrator

Principal and Vice-Chancellor of the University of Dundee
- In office January 2019 – November 2019
- Chancellor: Dame Jocelyn Bell Burnell
- Rector: Mark Beaumont; Jim Spence
- Preceded by: Sir Pete Downes

Personal details
- Born: 27 June 1966 (age 60) Liverpool, England
- Education: Yale University
- Profession: Academic administrator
- Institutions: Durham University; University of Lincoln; Lancaster University; University of Dundee

Andrew Atherton (born 27 June 1966) is Vice-President International and Engagement at the University of Southampton. From 2020 to 2023, he was Global Director Transnational Education for Navitas Limited, an education provider.

Atherton was a Professor and Principal and Vice-Chancellor of the University of Dundee which he held from January to November 2019. During his period as Principal of the University of Dundee, it rose to 4th in the UK for student satisfaction, its highest ever result, and to its highest league table position of 24th in the Sunday Times University Guide and 3rd in Scotland. During Atherton's tenure the University was also named Student Experience University of the Year by the Sunday Times as a result of its rise in student satisfaction. Atherton now holds the position of VP of International and Engagement at the University of Southampton. Prior to this role, he held academic and directorial positions at the universities of Durham, Lincoln, and Lancaster. His areas of academic interest are business and entrepreneurship, particularly related to small and medium-sized enterprises and China.

== Education ==
Atherton read Chinese and Economics at the School of Oriental and African Studies, University of London, graduating in 1989. This was followed, in 1992, by a Master's degree in International and Development Economics at Yale University in the United States. As a result of his studies of China, he is fluent in Mandarin. Andrew completed a PhD by publication in 2012 on the effectiveness of government enterprise policy at the University of Lincoln.

== Career ==
Atherton began his academic career at Durham University, in the Small Business Centre, Durham University Business School. Andrew was Director of the Policy Research Unit within the Small Business Centre from 1995 to 1999, establishing the Centre as an international policy research unit. In 1999, he became Head of Department of the department the Foundation for SME Development at the Durham University, which at that time was one of the world's leading centres for small and medium enterprise development and enterprise. He then moved to the University of Lincoln in 2002, where he worked for 10 years, initially as Director of Research in the Business School and then as Acting Dean of the School. He was appointed Pro Vice-Chancellor Strategy and Enterprise in 2006 and in 2010 became Senior Deputy Vice-Chancellor. In this role he worked toward the establishment of the School of Engineering, the first new engineering school in the UK for over 20 years, as well as contributing to the emergence of the University as one of the leading modern universities in the UK.

From Lincoln, he moved on to Lancaster in 2013 as Deputy Vice-Chancellor and Professor of Entrepreneurship. As Deputy Vice-Chancellor at the University of Lancaster, he was responsible for the development of the University, leading on resource planning and the annual planning cycle. He also led on creation of the Health Innovation Campus, a science park adjacent to the University, and led the team that attracted the Eden Project to Morecambe to create Eden North At Lancaster, Atherton also led on creation of a new campus in China, as a Joint Institute with Beijing Telecommunications University and creation of Lancaster University Leipzig, a campus based in Germany, which recruited its first students in 2019.

Atherton has published extensively on enterprise and small and medium enterprise development. On small and medium-size enterprises in China, Atherton had a book published (Entrepreneurship in China) with co-author Alex Newman in 2017.

After the retirement of Professor Sir Pete Downes from his principality at the University of Dundee, Atherton was announced as his successor in 2018. His tenure officially began on 1 January 2019.

On 30 and 31 October 2019, several Scottish newspapers reported that Atherton had been suspended from office, pending an independent investigation into allegations that he had failed to pay rent in full on the Principal's official residence—University House.

The financial statements 2019 for the University state that an outstanding balance of one month's rent was settled on 1 August 2019.

On 8 November 2019, it was announced that Atherton had resigned.

Atherton is currently Vice-President International and Engagement at the University of Southampton, and previously was Global Director Transnational Education (TNE) at Navitas Limited, a leading global education provider. At Navitas he was responsible for establishing new offshore campuses with University partners globally. He has also worked for the University of Cumbria on creating a new campus in Barrow-in-Furness. Atherton has been a Trustee of the Board of SOAS University London since 2017.

== Selection of published works ==
- Small firm success and the art of orienteering: the value of plans, planning, and strategic awareness in the competitive small firm with Hannon, (Journal of Small Business and Enterprise Development Vol 5 Issue 2 1998) https://www.emerald.com/insight/content/doi/10.1108/EUM0000000006759/full/html
- The uncertainty of knowing: An analysis of the nature of knowledge in a small business context, (Human Relations Vol 56 Issue 11 2003) https://journals.sagepub.com/doi/10.1177/00187267035611005
- Examining clusters formation from the ‘bottom-up’: An analysis of four cases in the North of England), (Environment and Planning C: Government and Policy vol. 21 no. 1 2003) https://journals.sagepub.com/doi/10.1068/c0115
- Should government be stimulating start-ups? An assessment of the scope for public intervention in new venture creation), (Environment and Planning C: Government and Policy vol. 24 no. 1 2006) https://journals.sagepub.com/doi/pdf/10.1068/c0436
- Structuring qualitative enquiry in management and organization research: A dialogue on the merits of using software for qualitative data analysis with Elsmore, (Qualitative research in organizations and management: An International Journal Vol 2 Issue 1 2007)
- Cases of start-up financing: An analysis of new venture capitalisation structures and patterns, (International Journal of Entrepreneurial Behavior & Research Vol 18 Issue 1 2012)
- Promoting private sector development in China – The challenge of building institutional capacity at the local level", Environment and Planning C: Government and Policy, vol. 31, no. 1 2013) https://journals.sagepub.com/doi/abs/10.1068/c1125b
- The decision to moonlight: Does second job holding by the self-employed and employed differ?, (Industrial Relations Journal vol. 47, no. 3 2016) https://onlinelibrary.wiley.com/doi/full/10.1111/irj.12135
- The emergence of the private entrepreneur in reform era China: Re-birth of an earlier tradition?, (Business History vol. 58 no. 3, 2016 Special Issue, History and Evolution of Entrepreneurship and Finance in China) https://www.tandfonline.com/doi/full/10.1080/00076791.2015.1122702
- Entrepreneurship in China: The Emergence of the Private Sector with Newman ISBN 9781315625126 (2017) https://www.routledge.com/Entrepreneurship-in-China-The-Emergence-of-the-Private-Sector-1st-Edition/Atherton-Newman/p/book/9781138650121

Academic offices
Preceded by Sir Pete Downes	Principal & Vice-Chancellor of the University of Dundee; 2019	Succeeded by Incumbent
