= Andrew Atherton =

Andrew Atherton may refer to:

- Andrew Atherton (gymnast), English gymnast
- Andrew Atherton (professor), English professor
