= Division of Signal Transduction Therapy =

Collaborative medical research organisation

- Formation: 1998
- Leader: Dario Alessi, Philip Cohen, Ron Hay
- Parent organization: University of Dundee
- Affiliations: AstraZeneca, Boehringer Ingelheim, GlaxoSmithKline, Merck Serono, Janssen Pharmaceutica and Pfizer
- Budget: £2.75 million/year
- Staff: 200
- Website: www.lifesci.dundee.ac.uk/research/dstt/

The Division of Signal Transduction Therapy or DSTT is an organization managed by the University of Dundee, the Medical Research Council, and the pharmaceutical companies AstraZeneca, Boehringer Ingelheim, GlaxoSmithKline, Merck Serono, Janssen Pharmaceutica, and Pfizer. The purpose of the collaboration is to conduct cell signalling research and to encourage development of new drug treatments for global diseases such as cancer, rheumatoid arthritis, and Parkinson's disease. Specifically the collaboration aims to target protein kinases and the ubiquitylation system in the development of these therapies. It is one of the largest ever collaborations between the commercial pharmaceutical industry and any academic research institute.

== Organizational resources and management ==
The organization was founded by Professor Sir Philip Cohen and Professor Pete Downes in 1998. In 2003 the organization's existence was renewed with £15 million funding, and in 2008 further renewed with £11 million. In July 2012 the collaboration was renewed once more with core support funding of £14.4 million under the directorship of Professor Dario Alessi.

It is made up from fifteen research teams based at the University of Dundee and along with support personnel totals nearly 200 members of staff. Thirteen of the teams are based within the MRC Protein Phosphorylation and Ubiquitylation Unit at the College of Life Sciences. The amount of funding and staff make DSTT the largest collaboration between the for-profit pharmaceutical industry and a university in the United Kingdom.

Under the DSTT's agreement, the commercial companies and the DSTT share access to their unpublished results, equipment, and staff expertise in the participating laboratories. The university staff gets steady funding, while the commercial companies get rights to license certain intellectual property produced. The DSTT does not conduct contract research on behalf of member companies; 60% of the budget is consumed by basic research chosen by the companies and the remaining 40% is used to provide analytical services and maintain the collection of reagents. The DSTT itself produces protein and lipid kinases, phosphatases and ubiquitin reagents for member companies to use in research and as targets for high-throughput screening. These reagents are prerequisites to the development of new drug leads, and the variety kept available by the DSTT is vast compared to what typical laboratories keep.

== Research ==
The focus of the DSTT is the study of protein phosphorylation and ubiquitylation.

Protein phosphorylation is a principal control mechanism in almost all aspects of cellular regulation of most organisms. Abnormalities in phosporylation contribute to many classes of diseases including cancer, diabetes, and rheumatoid arthritis.

== Awards ==
The University of Dundee received a Queen's Anniversary Prize in recognition of the DSTT being a model for research sharing between academic and commercial sectors. Elizabeth II and Prince Philip presented the prize on 16 February 2006.
