= Dario Alessi =

British biochemist (born 1967)

Dario Alessi OBE FRS FRSE
- Born: Dario Renato Alessi; December 1967 (age 58); France
- Education: University of Birmingham
- Known for: Protein kinase research
- Awards: Colworth Medal (1999); Morgagni Young Investigator Prize (2002); Pfizer Academic Award for Europe (2002); Makdougall Brisbane Prize (2002); Philip Leverhulme Prize (2002); FEBS Anniversary Prize of the Gesellschaft für Biochemie und Molekularbiologie (2003); EMBO Gold Medal (2005); Louis-Jeantet Prize (2023)
- Scientific career
- Fields: protein phosphorylation
- Workplaces: University of Dundee
- Academic advisors: Philip Cohen (postdoc)
- Website: lifesci.dundee.ac.uk/people/dario-alessi

Dario Renato Alessi (born 1967) is a French-born British biochemist, Director of the Medical Research Council Protein Phosphorylation and Ubiquitylation Unit (MRC PPU) and Professor of Signal Transduction, at the School of Life Sciences, University of Dundee.

== Education and career ==
He attended high school in Brussels. He graduated from the University of Birmingham, with a Bachelor of Science in biochemistry in 1988, and with a PhD in 1991, where he studied with Ian Trayer and David Trentham. His postdoctoral research was with Philip Cohen at the University of Dundee from 1991 to 1997. He became Professor of Signal Transduction at the University of Dundee in 2003 and Director of the MRC Protein Phosphorylation and Ubiquitylation Unit (MRC PPU) in 2012.

== Research ==
Alessi's work is concerned with unravelling the roles of poorly characterised components that regulate protein phosphorylation or ubiquitylation that have emerged from the genetic analysis of human disease. The aim of his research is to provide new knowledge to enable researchers to devise improved strategies for the treatment of Parkinson's disease. In particular, Alessi's research focuses on the leucine-rich repeat kinase LRRK2, as mutations that increase the kinase activity of this protein are one of the most common causes of inherited Parkinson's disease. Dario Alessi is also the current Director of the Division of Signal Transduction Therapy Unit (DSTT) which is a unique collaboration between University of Dundee and six major pharmaceutical companies (AstraZeneca, Boehringer Ingelheim, GlaxoSmithKline GlaxoSmithKline, Merck KGaA, Janssen Pharmaceuticals and Pfizer) that aims to accelerate drug discovery in the areas of protein phosphorylation and ubiquitylation. As of 2013 he has written over 180 peer-reviewed papers and has been cited more than 32,000 times, making him one of the most highly cited biochemists in the world.

== Honours and awards ==
Alessi has received many awards, among these the Colworth Medal (1999), the Eppendorf Young European Investigator Award (2000), Philip Leverhulme Prize (2002), EMBO Gold Medal (2005) and the Francis Crick Prize Lecture of the Royal Society (2006). He was elected a Fellow of the Royal Society of Edinburgh in 2002, Member of the European Molecular Biology Organisation (EMBO) in 2005, Fellow of the Royal Society in 2008 and Fellow of the Academy of Medical Sciences (FMedSci) in 2012. In 2023 he was awarded the Louis-Jeantet Prize for Medicine.

Alessi was appointed Officer of the Order of the British Empire (OBE) in the 2023 Birthday Honours for services to biomedical research and translation.
