= Jane Eddleston =

British physician, professor

- Born: 1957 (age 68–69); Stirling
- Education: University of Dundee
- Scientific career
- Workplaces: Manchester Royal Infirmary

Jane Eddleston (born 1957) is a British medical doctor, professor and critical care consultant at Manchester Royal Infirmary. In 2022 she became the first woman doctor to win the Faculty of Intensive Care Medicine Gold Medal.

== Early life and education ==
Eddleston is from Stirling. She studied medicine at the University of Dundee. At the time, one third of medical students were women.

== Research and career ==
She is Consultant in Intensive Care Medicine and Anaesthesia and Joint Group Medical Director at the Manchester Royal Infirmary. She also serves as Clinical Chair of the Greater Manchester Critical Care Operational Delivery Network, and member, Faculty Board for Intensive Care Medicine. She is Chair, Oversight Board, Manchester Rare Conditions Centre.

She has developed guidelines to respond to acute illness of adults in hospital. The guidelines recognised that patients in hospital are at risk of becoming ill due to the complexity of their conditions, comorbidities and age. If managed inappropriately, deteriorating health in hospital can compromise referral to critical care, and even result in unnecessary death. She suggested that critical care teams should write a clear, written monitoring plan to document the diagnosis, potential comorbidities and treatment plan.

During the COVID-19 pandemic in the United Kingdom, she helped to deliver the Manchester Hospital Trust pandemic response plan. During the infected blood scandal, Eddleston gave evidence on behalf of the Manchester Royal Infirmary.

In 2022, she was awarded the Faculty of Intensive Care Medicine Gold Medal. Her award citation read, “many working in intensive care medicine today have been influenced by her and many patients and services have benefited from her vision and drive for improvement,”. Under her leadership, Greater Manchester were awarded funding for health research that delivers earlier and more accurate detection, diagnosis and prognosis of disease.

== Selected publications ==
- Jones, Christina; Skirrow, Paul; Griffiths, Richard; Gerald H. Humphris; Ingleby, Sarah; Eddleston, Jane; Waldmann, Carl; Gager, Melanie (2003). "Rehabilitation after critical illness: A randomized, controlled trial". Critical Care Medicine. 31 (10): 2456–2461. doi:10.1097/01.ccm.0000089938.56725.33. PMID 14530751. Wikidata Q51017054.
- Jones, Christina; Skirrow, Paul; Griffiths, Richard; Humphris, Gerrald; Ingleby, Sarah; Eddleston, Jane; Waldmann, Carl; Gager, Melanie (2004). "Post-traumatic stress disorder-related symptoms in relatives of patients following intensive care". Intensive Care Medicine. 30 (3): 456–460. doi:10.1007/s00134-003-2149-5. PMID 14767589. Wikidata Q51008791.
- Eddleston, Jane; White, Pauline; Guthrie, Elspeth (2000). "Survival, morbidity, and quality of life after discharge from intensive care". Critical Care Medicine. 28 (7): 2293–2299. doi:10.1097/00003246-200007000-00018. PMID 10921555. Wikidata Q48716859.
