= Jim Spence (broadcaster) =

Scottish sports presenter

- Education: Dundee University
- Occupation: Sport Broadcaster Academic
- Organization: Dundee University

Jim "Ping" Spence is a Scottish Sports presenter from Dundee who works for BBC Scotland and was rector of Dundee University before stepping down in 2021.

== Career ==
Spence presented the nightly football magazine 90 Minutes on BBC Radio Scotland from 2004 until it was axed in 2006 to make way for more comprehensive sports coverage. Spence now hosts the station's weeknight programme Sportsound twice a week.

Spence is a fan of Dundee United F.C. He became an Internet hit in 2009 after a faltering interview with Slovak goalkeeper Dušan Perniš. Despite Perniš apologising for his poor English, Spence continues the interview with limited success. He is forced to rephrase each question several times, but just receives baffled looks from the goalkeeper.

In 2015 it was announced that Spence had joined the Dundee-based newspaper The Courier as columnist. As of 2016 he is a sports columnist for the newspaper.

Spence has also been impersonated by Jonathan Watson on the BBC Scotland comedy show Only an Excuse? during his time fronting 90 Minutes.

He studied law at the University of Dundee as a mature student. In February 2019 it was announced he had been chosen as the new Rector of the University of Dundee, in succession to Mark Beaumont. In March 2021 it was announced that he was standing down as Rector before completing his three year term. His departure followed a derogatory comment made about students pursuing politics degrees. Spence, however, cited "a change in his commitments" which meant he was unable to devote enough time to supporting students.

On 5 May he joined Dundee United as Club consultant.

Academic offices
Preceded by Mark Beaumont	Rector of the University of Dundee; 2019–2021	Succeeded by Keith Harris
