= Philip Cohen (British biochemist) =

British biochemist (born 1945)

Sir Philip Cohen FRS FRSE FMedSci
- Born: 22 July 1945 (age 81); Middlesex, England
- Education: University College London
- Known for: research into protein phosphorylation
- Spouse: Tricia Cohen
- Awards: Anniversary Prize of the FEBS (1977); Colworth Medal (1977); CIBA Medal (1991); Prix van Gysel (1992); RSE Bruce Preller Prize (1993); Louis-Jeantet Prize for Medicine (1997)); Datta Medal (1997); Knight Bachelor (1998); RSE Royal Medal (2004); Royal Medal (2008); Albert Einstein World Award of Science (2014); Lifetime Achievement Award at Scotland’s Life Sciences Awards (2023); The Courier Business Awards Outstanding Contribution Award (2025)
- Scientific career
- Fields: protein phosphorylation
- Workplaces: University of Dundee
- Doctoral advisor: Michael Rosemeyer
- Notable students: Dario Alessi, Claire E. Eyers
- Website: www.lifesci.dundee.ac.uk/people/philip-cohen

Sir Philip Cohen (born 22 July 1945) is a British biochemist known for his extensive contributions to the field of biochemistry, especially to the understanding of the role of reversible protein phosphorylation in cell regulation.

== Early life and education ==
Cohen was born on 22 July 1945. After attending Hendon County Grammar School in North London from 1956 to 1963, he pursued a B.Sc. in Biochemistry at University College London, graduating with 1st Class Honours in 1966.

== Research and career ==
Cohen continued at University College London and obtained his PhD in Biochemistry in 1969 under the guidance of Dr. Michael A. Rosemeyer. His thesis was entitled "The Subunits of Glucose-6-Phosphate Dehydrogenase". Cohen's early postdoctoral work was supported by an SRC-NATO Postdoctoral Fellowship, allowing him to collaborate with Professor Edmond H. Fischer at the University of Washington in Seattle from 1969 to 1971.

In 1971, Cohen returned to the UK, taking up a Lecturer position in the Department of Biochemistry at the University of Dundee. This was a position he held until December 1978. During this period, he also received a Wellcome Trust Special Research Fellowship from January 1976 to December 1978. His career at Dundee saw a series of promotions: he became a Reader in the Department of Biochemistry in 1978, and by 1981, he was appointed Professor of Enzymology.

Cohen's contributions to the field were recognized by the Royal Society, which appointed him as a Research Professor at the University of Dundee from October 1984 to September 2010. His leadership roles expanded over the years, with him directing the Medical Research Council Protein Phosphorylation Group from 1983 to 1989, the Medical Research Council Protein Phosphorylation Unit from 1990 to March 2012 and the Scottish Institute for Cell Signalling from 2008 until 2012. He reverted to his original position as Professor of Enzymology at the School of Life Sciences, University of Dundee, from April 2012 onwards. His expertise also brought him to the international stage, serving as a Vallee Visiting Professor at Harvard Medical School since November 2013.

Cohen played a pivotal role in forming the Division of Signal Transduction Therapy in July 1998, co-directoring it with Sir Peter Downes until June 2012 and continuing as its deputy director until 2022.

In 2023, Cohen and his family set up the Tricia Cohen Memorial Trust (TCMT) to provide PhD studentships in memory of his late wife and colleague Tricia to whom he was married for over 50 years.

== Awards and recognition ==
Cohen was elected a Member of the European Molecular Biology Organisation in 1982 and subsequently became a Fellow of the Royal Societies of both London and Edinburgh in 1984. He received the CIBA Medal and Prize (now the Novartis Medal and Prize) from the British Biochemical Society in 1992. In the 1990s he won prizes such as the Prix Van Gysel of the Belgian Royal Academies of Medicine, the Bruce-Preller Prize of the Royal Society of Edinburgh, the Pfizer Innovation Award for Europe, and the Louis Jeantet Prize for Medicine.

He was knighted by Queen Elizabeth II in 1998 for "Services to Biochemistry". He also received honors, including the Sir Hans Krebs Medal of the Federation of European Biochemical Societies, the Bristol-Myers Squibb Distinguished Achievement Award, the Debrecen Award for Molecular Medicine and the Rolf Luft Award of the Karolinska Institute, Sweden. He was also recognised as the World's second-most cited scientist in "Biology and Biochemistry" from 1992 to 2003 and received Royal Medals from both the Royal Society of Edinburgh (2004) and Royal Society of London (2008).

Cohen has been appointed as a Foreign Associate of the National Academy of Sciences of the USA in 2008 National Academy of Sciences and a Fellow of the American Society for Microbiology in 2009. His lifetime contributions were acknowledged with the MRC Millenium Medal in 2013, the Albert Einstein World Award of Science in 2014, and recipient of the Lifetime Achievement Award from Scotland's Life Sciences Industry and The Herald Higher Education Lifetime Achievement Award in 2023.

== Notable contributions ==
Cohen has made advances to the understanding of how protein phosphorylation and dephosphorylation events regulate cell life, His contributions include the dissection of a major part of the insulin signal transduction pathway, the classification of protein phosphatases and identification of mechanisms that regulate their biological functions, and the dissection of mitogen-activated protein kinase cascades. Sir Philip also developed large panels of protein kinases to profile the specificities of protein kinase inhibitors that have been used widely in the development of kinase-inhibiting drugs and to study the roles of protein kinases in cell regulation. Since 2008 his research has focused on how the interplay between protein phosphorylation and protein ubiquitylation regulates innate immunity. Earlier in his career he also made several contributions to the understanding of how glycogen molecules are synthesized de novo and the molecular mechanisms that trigger the mobilisation of glycogen. Some notable examples of his publications on these topics are the following:

- Glycogen synthase kinase-3 from rabbit skeletal muscle; separation from cyclic AMP-dependent protein kinase and phosphorylase kinase.
- Glycogen synthase from rabbit skeletal muscle: effects of insulin on the state of phosphorylation of the seven phosphoserine residues in vivo
- Inhibition of glycogen synthase kinase-3 by insulin mediated by protein kinase B
- Mechanism of activation of protein kinase B by insulin and IGF‐1
- Molecular basis for the substrate specificity of protein kinase B; comparison with MAPKAP kinase-1 and p70 S6 kinase
- Characterization of a 3-phosphoinositide-dependent protein kinase which phosphorylates and activates protein kinase Bα.
