= Universities Scotland =

- Formation: 1992, renamed 2000
- Headquarters: Universities Scotland Holyrood Park House 106 Holyrood Road Edinburgh EH8 8AS
- Location: Scotland
- Members: 19 higher education institutions
- Convener: Professor Iain Gillespie
- Key people: Director: Claire McPherson
- Staff: 13
- Website: http://www.universities-scotland.ac.uk/

Universities Scotland (Scottish Gaelic: Oilthighean na h-Alba) was formed in 1992 as the Committee of Scottish Higher Education Principals (COSHEP) adopting its current name in 2000, when Universities UK was also formed. It represents 19 autonomous higher education institutions, 16 of them with University status and three other higher education institutions in Scotland. The Convener serves a two-year term of office. From 1 August 2023, this post is held by Professor Iain Gillespie, principal of the University of Dundee, while Claire McPherson has served as the organization's Director since March 2024.

== Members ==
The following are members:

Aberdeen

- University of Aberdeen
- Robert Gordon University

Dundee

- Abertay University
- University of Dundee

Edinburgh

- University of Edinburgh
- Edinburgh Napier University
- Heriot-Watt University
- Queen Margaret University

Glasgow

- University of Glasgow
- Glasgow Caledonian University
- Glasgow School of Art
- Royal Conservatoire of Scotland
- University of Strathclyde

St Andrews

- University of St Andrews

Stirling

- University of Stirling

Multiple Cities

- Open University in Scotland
- Scotland's Rural College
- University of the Highlands and Islands
- University of the West of Scotland

== See also ==
- Universities UK
- List of universities in Scotland
