= Lancaster University Leipzig =

Private university in Leipzig, Germany

- Established: January, 2020
- Affiliation: Lancaster University
- Students: 400 (2023)
- Address: Nikolaistraße 10, 04109, Leipzig, Germany
- Campus: Urban
- Language: English
- Website: www.lancasterleipzig.de

Lancaster University Leipzig is a branch campus of Lancaster University in Leipzig, Germany. Established in 2020, it is the first public UK university with a campus in Germany. Lancaster University Leipzig has been approved by the Saxon State Ministry for Higher Education, Research, and the Arts.

Courses offered at the university include undergraduate degrees in management, finance, computing and IT fields, a postgraduate degree in logistics and supply chain management, and pre-master’s in business and computer science.

The programme portfolio is tailored to the key industries in Leipzig and the Leipzig Region, such as digital technology and logistics.

Students who study and graduate in Leipzig receive their degree from Lancaster University in the United Kingdom.

== History ==
Lancaster University decided on Leipzig for its new campus location after evaluating numerous European cities, partially because of its high economic growth, growing student population, and touristic appeal. This became the fourth campus overseas for the British university, which already had institutions in China, Ghana and Malaysia.

The first students enrolled in January 2020, just before the COVID-19 pandemic. The university had to quickly transition to a hybrid mode that lasts until today, allowing students to join online if their visas are not approved by the time the course starts.

Lancaster University Leipzig has a diverse international student body with more than 90 nationalities on campus. 60% of the students are originally from non-EU countries, 30% from other EU countries and 10% from Germany.

== Campus ==
The new campus is located in Strohsackpassage, in the center of Leipzig. The offices were renovated with the goal of providing a modern, hybrid-friendly education.

== Education ==
Language courses: All courses are taught in English. However, German courses are offered free of charge in the first year of studies to non-German speaking students.

Undergraduate degrees:

- BSc (Hons) Accounting and Finance
- BSc (Hons) Business Management
- BSc (Hons) Business Management with Accounting and Finance
- BSc (Hons) Business Management with Business Analytics
- BSc (Hons) Business Management and Media
- BSc (Hons) Computer Science
- BSc (Hons) Software Engineering

Foundation programmes: Designed for students who do not meet the entry requirements for direct degree entry.

- Foundation in Business
- Foundation in Computer Science

Postgraduate degrees:

- MSc in Logistics and Supply Chain Management
- MSc Management
- MSc Data Science
- MSc Cyber Security

Pre-Master's programmes:

- Pre-Master’s in Business
- Pre-Master’s Computer Science

Lancaster University Leipzig offers different tuition fees for EU/UK and international applicants. The university charges tuition fees that are generally lower than the international fees for the same degrees delivered on the UK campus. The institution partners with Brain Capital, an organisation that offers financing of tuition fees with an income-share agreement.
