= University of Dundee =

Public university in Dundee, Scotland

Coordinates: 56°27′26″N 2°58′49″W

- Official Coat of Arms (as granted by Lyon Court)
- Motto: Latin: Magnificat anima mea dominum
- Motto in English: "My soul doth magnify the Lord"
- Type: Public university
- Established: 1967 – gained independent university status by royal charter 1897 – Constituent college of the University of St Andrews; 1881 – University College
- Affiliations: ACU; DSC; EUA; UArctic; Universities Scotland; Universities UK
- Endowment: £37.2 million (2024)
- Budget: £324.9 million (2023/24)
- Chancellor: The Baron Robertson of Port Ellen
- Rector: Maggie Chapman
- Principal: Angela Scott
- Academic staff: 1,525 (2024/25)
- Administrative staff: 1,855 (2024/25)
- Students: 13,435 (2024/25); 11,820 FTE (2024/25)
- Undergraduates: 9,785 (2024/25)
- Postgraduates: 3,650 (2024/25)
- Location: Dundee, Scotland, UK
Colours
- Website: dundee.ac.uk

The University of Dundee (Note: Scottish Gaelic: Oilthigh Dhùn Dè; [ˈɔlhɪj ɣun ˈtʲeː]. Abbreviated as Dund. for post-nominals.) is a public research university located in the city of Dundee, Scotland. It was founded as a university college in 1881 with a donation from the prominent Baxter family of textile manufacturers. The institution was, for most of its early existence, a constituent college of the University of St Andrews alongside United College and St Mary's College located in the town of St Andrews itself. Following significant expansion, the University of Dundee gained independent university status by royal charter in 1967 while retaining elements of its ancient heritage and governance structure.

The main campus of the university is located in Dundee's West End, which contains many of the university's teaching and research facilities; the Duncan of Jordanstone College of Art and Design, Dundee Law School and the Dundee Dental Hospital and School. The university has additional facilities at Ninewells Hospital, containing its School of Medicine; Perth Royal Infirmary, which houses a clinical research centre; and in Kirkcaldy, Fife, containing part of its School of Health Sciences. The annual income of the institution for 2023–24 was £324.9 million of which £71.2 million was from research grants and contracts, with an expenditure of £253.6 million.

== History ==
=== Foundation ===
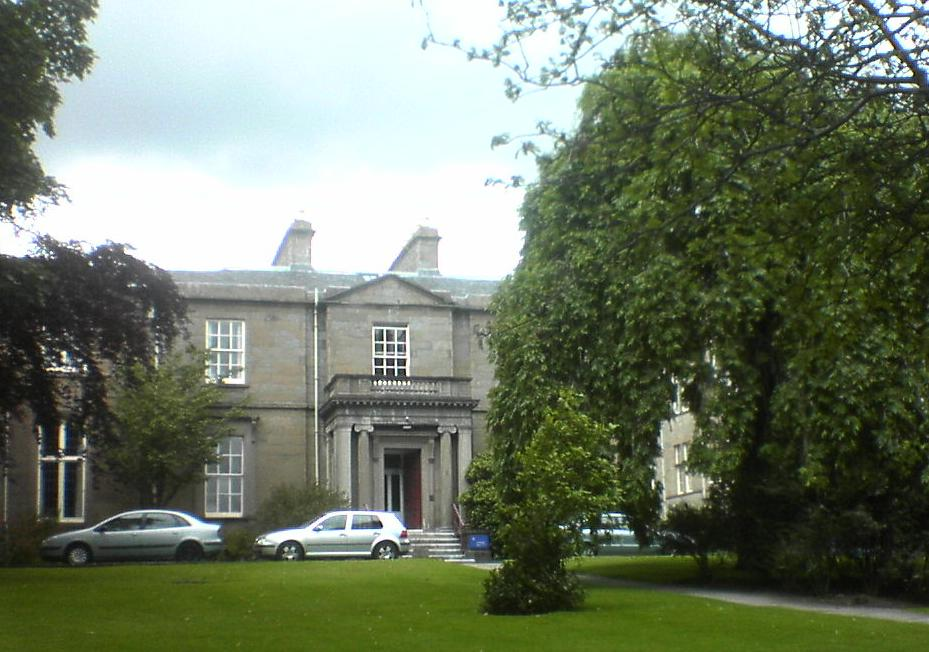
Ellenbank: the former Students' Union, now the School of Business is one of the longest-used buildings of the university.

The University of Dundee has its roots in the earlier university college based in Dundee and the University of St Andrews. During the 19th century, the growing population of Dundee significantly increased demand for the establishment of an institution of higher education in the city and several organisations were established to promote this end, including a University Club in the city. There was a significant movement with the intention of moving the entire university to Dundee (which the royal commission observed was now a "large and increasing town") or the establishment of a college along very similar lines to the present United College. Finally, agreement was reached that what was needed was expansion of the sciences and professions, rather than the arts at St Andrews.

A donation of £120,000 for the creation of an institution of higher education in Dundee was made by Miss Mary Ann Baxter of Balgavies, a notable lady of the city and heir to the fortune of William Baxter of Balgavies. In this endeavour, she was assisted by her relative, John Boyd Baxter, an alumnus of St Andrews and Procurator Fiscal of Forfarshire who also contributed nearly £20,000. In order to craft the institution and its principles, it was to be established first as an independent university college, with a view from its very inception towards incorporation into the University of St Andrews.

In 1881, the ideals of the proposed new college were laid down, suggesting the establishment of an institute for "promoting the education of persons of both sexes and the study of Science, Literature and the Fine Arts". The university currently identifies 1881 as the year of its foundation, as University College's endowment was dated 31 December 1881, but the year 1880, when the announcement of Mary Ann Baxter's funding was made, as well as the years 1882 and 1883 have also been cited as their foundation year by the institution in the past.

No religious oaths were to be required of members. Later that year, "University College, Dundee" was established as an academic institution and the first principal, Sir William Peterson, was elected in late 1882. When opened in 1883, it comprised five faculties: Maths and Natural Philosophy, Chemistry, Engineering and Drawing, English Language and Literature and Modern History, and Philosophy. The University College had no power to award degrees and for some years some students were prepared for external examinations of the University of London. By 1894, the faculties offered at the college remained essentially scientific in outlook, with three academics – including the principal, William Peterson – giving instruction in classics, philosophy, English and history at both the Dundee and St Andrews sites.

The policy of no discrimination between the sexes, which was insisted upon by Mary Ann Baxter, meant that the new college recruited several able female students. Their number included the social reformer Mary Lily Walker and, later, Margaret Fairlie who in 1940 became Scotland's first female professor. Another early female graduate, Ruth Wilson, later Young, became professor of surgery at Lady Hardinge Medical College in Delhi and later became its principal.

=== Incorporation into the University of St Andrews ===
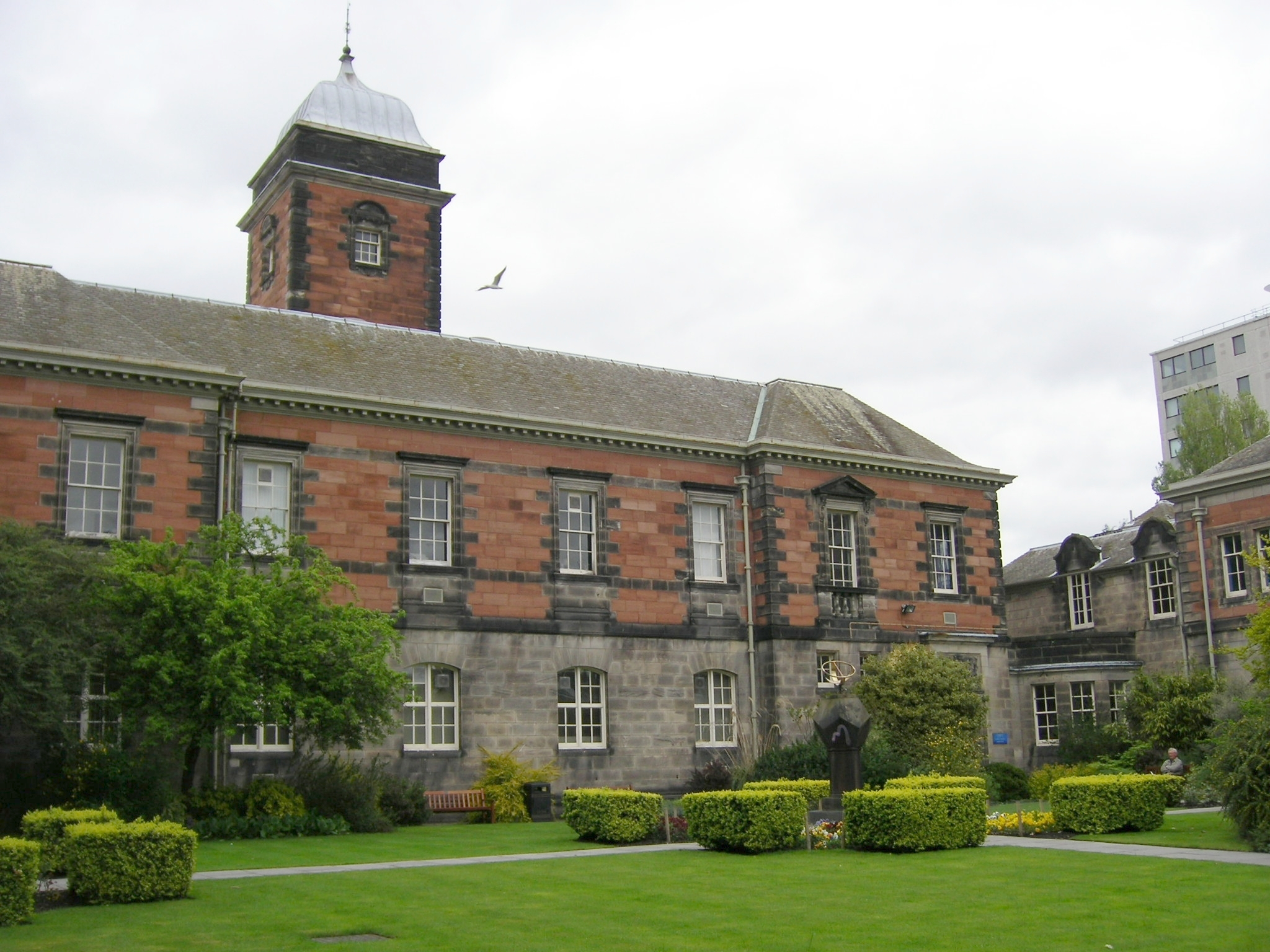
The Harris Building on the Geddes Quadrangle

Following discussions around various forms of incorporation and association, students were able to matriculate through the University of St Andrews from 1885. The full incorporation was completed in 1897 when University College became part of the University of St Andrews. This move was of notable benefit to both, enabling the University of St Andrews (which was in a small town) to support a medical school. Medical students could choose to undertake preclinical studies either in Dundee or St Andrews (at the Bute Medical School) after which all students would undertake their clinical studies at Dundee. Eventually, law, dentistry and other professional subjects were taught at University College. By 1904 University College had a roll of 208, making up 40 per cent of the roll of the university generally. By session 1909–1910, 234 students were studying at University College, 101 of whom were female. Among the notable students at this time were Robert Watson-Watt, the radar pioneer; William Alexander Young the epidemiologist who later died in Accra while studying yellow fever; and David Rutherford Dow who would go on to be a senior member of staff at the college.

In 1895, unlike the students at St Andrews, there were reportedly very few "bona-fide" matriculated students at Dundee who were "aiming to graduate". During the academic years of 1892–4, those students at Dundee who had matriculated at St Andrews were considered St Andrews University students and were subsequently awarded degrees by St. Andrews. Although the union between the two institutions was then threatened by a lawsuit, by 1898 the union with St. Andrews was restored on the original basis.

University College's development in the early twentieth century has been described as "slow and fitful" and the interwar period saw virtually no new building projects, leaving large parts of the college housed in buildings which were not fit for purpose. Kenneth Baxter has claimed that World War I had a major impact on University College and stated that the conflict presented it with "a storm of challenges unlike anything it had faced" up to that point. Baxter contends that the War impacted the college greatly, with key consequences being declining student numbers which in turn led to a loss of income, as well as staff departures and the decaying of fabric. In 2018 it was revealed that research shows that while the college's war memorial records the names of 37 staff and former students who died at least a further 39 alumni of the college were not recorded on it. In 1920 the college received a war trophy in the form of a "40 ton, 15 cm field gun", which was thought to have been captured from Bulgarian forces and was sited in front of the students Union.

Attempts were made to raise income. In 1923 Rudyard Kipling, then the rector of the University of St Andrews, visited University College and asked the merchant princes and leading citizens of Dundee to give the college their money and support. Kipling implored those who had lost their sons in the Great War to consider giving a donation so that their names would live on. Staff of a high calibre continued to be employed by the university including Alexander Peacock and Margaret Fairlie, who in 1940 was appointed as professor of obstetrics and gynaecology and thus became the first woman to hold a professorial chair at a university in Scotland.

In 1947, the principal of University College, Douglas Wimberley released the "Wimberley Memo" (resulting in the Cooper and Tedder reports of 1952), advocating independence for the college. In 1954, after a royal commission, University College was renamed "Queen's College" and the Dundee-based elements of the university gained a greater degree of independence and flexibility. It was also at this time that Queen's College absorbed the former Dundee School of Economics as well as the jointly administered medical school and dental school.

=== Creation of the University of Dundee ===
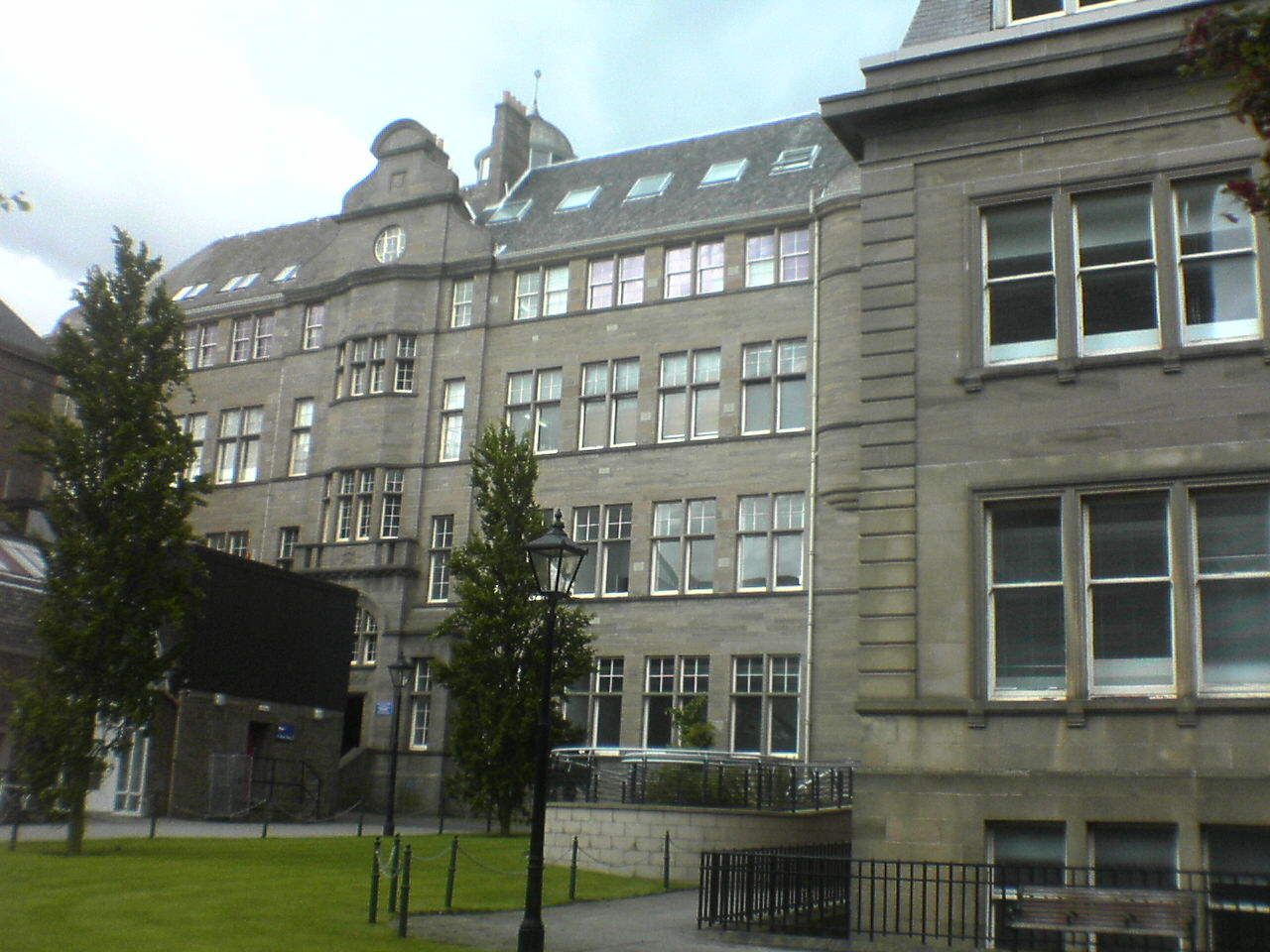
The Old Medical School, an example of expansion into the professions and purpose-built university structures from the turn of the 20th century

The publication of the Robbins Report on Higher Education in 1963, which considered the question of university education expansion throughout the country, provided impetus to the movement to attain independent university status for Dundee. At this time, a number of new institutions were being elevated to this status, such as the University of Stirling, and second universities were created in Edinburgh and Glasgow (Heriot-Watt University and the University of Strathclyde) despite their having fewer than 2,000 students.

Queen's College's size and location, alongside a willingness to expand, led to an eventual decision to separate from the wider university of which it remained an integral part. In 1966, St Andrews University Court and the Council of Queen's College submitted a joint petition to the Privy Council seeking the grant of a royal charter to establish the University of Dundee. This petition was approved and the Charter was granted which saw Queen's College become the University of Dundee, on 1 August 1967. The university continued a number of the traditions of its originator college and university and continues to be organised under the ancient university governance structure.

=== Modern developments ===
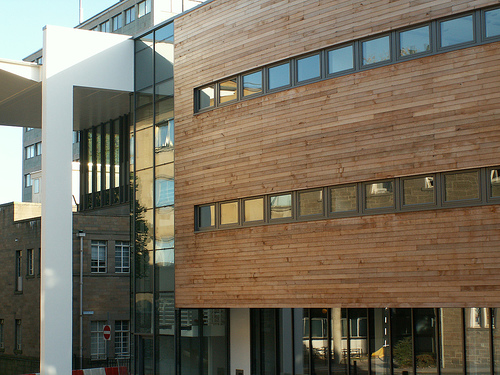
Extension to the main library of the university, early 2008.

In 1974, the university began to validate some degrees from Dundee's Duncan of Jordanstone College of Art and Design, and by 1988 all degrees from that institution were being validated in this fashion. In 1994 the two institutions merged, with the college becoming a constituent faculty of the university. In 1996, the Tayside College of Nursing and the Fife College of Health studies became part of the university, as a school of Nursing and Midwifery. For several years, Dundee College of Education prepared students for degree examinations at the University of Dundee, and in December 2001 the university merged with the Dundee campus of Northern College to create a Faculty of Education and Social Work.

In October 2005, the university became home to the first UNESCO centre in the United Kingdom. The IHP-HELP Centre for Water Law, Policy and Science is involved in research regarding the management of the world's water resources on behalf of the United Nations. A school of accounting and finance was introduced in 2007. These disciplines are now part of the School of Business.

Due to the COVID-19 pandemic, the university suspended most face to face teaching from 16 March 2020. However, a "blended learning" approach was offered to many students with weekly tutorials available in person for small groups using COVID-19 protocols of social distancing and regular cleaning.

=== Financial crisis (2024–present) ===
In November 2024, under Principal Iain Gillespie, the university announced that it was facing a major financial crisis, reporting a projected deficit that led to plans for significant cost-saving measures, including large-scale staff reductions. Gillespie resigned in December 2024 and was succeeded on an interim basis by Shane O'Neill.

The crisis prompted intervention by the Scottish Funding Council, which commissioned an independent investigation chaired by Professor Pamela Gillies. Published in June 2025, the investigation concluded that the university's financial position had deteriorated because of a combination of poor financial judgement, inadequate management and reporting, poor monitoring of financial sustainability, a lack of agility in responding to declining income, and weak governance in relation to financial accountability by the University Court.

Following publication of the report, interim Principal Shane O'Neill, Acting Chair of Court Tricia Bey, and Finance and Policy Committee convenor Carla Rossini resigned, while the university began implementing a programme of financial recovery and organisational restructuring.

In September 2026, members of the University and College Union began five weeks of industrial action to try to force the university to withdraw the threat of compulsory redundancies as a result of the financial crisis.

== Financial crisis (2024–present) ==
=== Background ===
In November 2024, the University of Dundee disclosed a serious deterioration in its financial position. The university stated that it was facing an anticipated deficit of £30 million, citing factors including a severe fall in international student recruitment, structural underfunding of higher education, cost increases, inflationary pressures and increased National Insurance contributions.

The financial position had been presented to the University Court on 12 November 2024. According to a later briefing prepared for the Scottish Parliament's Education, Children and Young People Committee, the Court was informed by then-Principal Iain Gillespie that the university faced a deficit of £30 million and was advised not to sign off the draft financial statements. The briefing also recorded that the university's cash balance had fallen from just over £70 million at the end of the 2022–23 financial year to just over £30 million at the end of 2023–24, alongside an operational deficit of £12.3 million.

The university's initial explanation placed the crisis within wider financial pressures affecting the higher education sector, including reduced real-terms funding, inflationary costs and changes in student recruitment. However, the University also acknowledged internal factors, including inadequate financial discipline and control, poor capital planning and investment decisions, weak compliance with financial control policies, and lack of accountability.

The crisis was later described by the Scottish Funding Council as a serious and apparently sudden deterioration in the university's financial position. Its independent investigation, published in June 2025, stated that despite significant financial pressures affecting the Scottish higher education sector, Dundee was the only one of Scotland's nineteen universities and specialist institutions to have suffered a financial collapse of this nature. The report concluded that the main causal factors were largely specific to the University of Dundee.

=== Leadership changes ===
The financial crisis resulted in substantial changes to the university's senior leadership and governing body. On 6 December 2024, Principal and Vice-Chancellor Iain Gillespie resigned after the university disclosed the scale of its financial difficulties. His resignation followed growing concern over the university's financial position and came less than a month after the University Court had been informed of a projected deficit of approximately £30 million.

Professor Shane O'Neill, the university's Deputy Vice-Chancellor and Provost, was appointed Interim Principal and Vice-Chancellor. During his tenure the university developed a financial recovery plan, engaged with the Scottish Funding Council, and cooperated with the independent investigation chaired by Professor Pamela Gillies.

The publication of the Gillies Report on 19 June 2025 led to a further series of senior resignations. The report identified significant failures in financial management, governance and institutional oversight during the period examined and made a number of recommendations for reform. On 20 June 2025, O'Neill resigned as Interim Principal and Vice-Chancellor, alongside Acting Chair of Court Tricia Bey and Finance and Policy Committee convenor Carla Rossini.

Later that day, Professor Nigel Seaton, former Principal of Abertay University, was appointed Interim Principal and Vice-Chancellor. His appointment formed part of the university's recovery programme, with responsibility for implementing the recommendations of the Gillies Report, restoring financial stability and leading the university through organisational restructuring.

Between November 2024 and June 2025, the university had three successive holders of the office of Principal and Vice-Chancellor, together with significant changes to the University's governing body, reflecting the scale of the institutional response to the crisis.

=== Gillies Report ===
In December 2024, the Scottish Funding Council (SFC) commissioned an independent investigation into the causes of the University's financial crisis. The investigation was chaired by Professor Pamela Gillies, former Principal and Vice-Chancellor of Glasgow Caledonian University, and conducted by professional services firm BDO. Its terms of reference included financial management, financial reporting, governance, institutional oversight and organisational culture, and sought to establish why the University's financial deterioration had not been identified and reported earlier.

Published on 19 June 2025, the report concluded that the University's financial collapse was largely attributable to internal failures rather than wider sector pressures. It identified the principal causal factors as "poor financial judgement, inadequate management and reporting, poor monitoring of the financial sustainability key performance indicator, lack of agility in responding to a fall in income by the University leadership and weak governance in relation to financial accountability by the Court", concluding that "financial oversight was lacking when most needed".

The report found that these failures were compounded by "the top-down, hierarchical and reportedly over-confident style of leadership and management", a lack of transparency and clarity in financial reporting, the promotion of an unduly positive narrative regarding the University's finances, and "a culture in which challenge was actively discouraged". It concluded that, while cultural issues were not the primary cause of the University's financial collapse, they contributed to limited transparency, inadequate scrutiny and a failure to respond effectively to emerging financial risks.

The investigation identified significant weaknesses in governance and financial oversight. It concluded that unrealistic assumptions relating to future savings and income had masked the University's underlying financial position, while financial information presented to the University Executive Group, the Finance and Policy Committee and the University Court was often insufficiently clear to enable effective scrutiny. It found that executive management and the governing body had failed to challenge these assumptions adequately or respond with sufficient urgency as the University's financial position deteriorated.

The report also examined organisational culture and the University's arrangements for raising concerns. Drawing on written submissions, interviews and evidence from staff, trade unions and members of Court, it concluded that the University Executive Group had not cultivated "a culture of openness and challenge at all levels". Evidence presented to the investigation described inhibited dissent, poor information sharing, limited transparency and a leadership style that promoted a consistently positive narrative. The report also questioned whether the dual role of the University Secretary as Chief Operating Officer could undermine confidence in the independence of the University's whistleblowing arrangements.

The investigation made 34 recommendations aimed at strengthening financial management, governance, executive accountability, transparency, risk management and organisational culture. Following publication of the report, the SFC described its findings as identifying the circumstances that had led to the University's financial challenges, while the University accepted that there had been "clear failings in financial monitoring, leadership, and governance" and committed to implementing the report's recommendations as part of its recovery programme.

=== Scottish Parliament scrutiny ===
The University's financial crisis became the subject of a series of inquiries by the Scottish Parliament's Education, Children and Young People Committee during 2025. The Committee took evidence from representatives of the University of Dundee, the Scottish Funding Council, former members of the University's senior leadership and governing body, and other stakeholders as part of its scrutiny of the causes of the financial collapse and the University's recovery plans.

Following publication of the Gillies Report, former Principal Iain Gillespie appeared before the Committee on 26 June 2025. Opening the session, Committee Convener Douglas Ross described the Gillies Report as "damning" and questioned Gillespie over his leadership, financial oversight and management of the University. Gillespie offered "a heartfelt apology" to staff and students, stating that they "deserve better than they have had with the management and the governance of the University of Dundee", while accepting that "the buck stops with me".

During the evidence session, MSPs questioned Gillespie about statements made to staff regarding the University's financial position, the use of optimistic financial assumptions, declining cash reserves, banking covenant breaches and executive accountability. Gillespie accepted that statements he had previously made about the University's financial outlook had been "incorrect", but rejected suggestions that he had deliberately misled staff. He also stated that he had been unaware of the University's 2023 banking covenant breach until reading the Gillies Report, prompting further questioning from Committee members regarding governance and executive oversight.

The Committee subsequently heard evidence from former Director of Finance Peter Fotheringham, former Chief Operating Officer Jim McGeorge and former Chair of Court Amanda Millar. The hearings examined financial reporting, governance arrangements, investment decisions, executive decision-making and organisational culture. Witnesses acknowledged shortcomings in financial management and governance, while MSPs questioned the effectiveness of challenge within the University's executive leadership and governing body.

The Committee continued to receive written evidence from the University, the Scottish Funding Council, trade unions and the Scottish Government as it monitored implementation of the University's recovery programme and the recommendations of the Gillies Report.

=== Scottish Funding Council and Scottish Government intervention ===
Following the disclosure of the University's financial difficulties in November 2024, the Scottish Funding Council (SFC) assumed a central role in overseeing the institution's financial recovery. The SFC worked with the University to develop a Financial Recovery Plan, provided emergency financial support, commissioned an independent investigation into the causes of the crisis, and required regular reporting on the implementation of the recovery programme.

The Scottish Government also became directly involved in the University's recovery. On 24 June 2025, Cabinet Secretary for Education and Skills Jenny Gilruth told the Scottish Parliament that the Government would provide funding in principle of up to £40 million, to be delivered through the Scottish Funding Council over two academic years or three financial years. The funding was made subject to due diligence and the University demonstrating a sustainable long-term recovery plan. Gilruth described the circumstances as "unique and unprecedented", stating that they required an equally unprecedented response from the Scottish Government.

The additional support followed an earlier package of £22 million agreed by the Scottish Funding Council as part of the University's immediate recovery plan. In total, the Scottish Government stated that up to £62 million of additional public funding had been made available through the SFC, subject to conditions designed to secure the University's long-term financial sustainability and strengthen governance arrangements.

The intervention was the first occasion on which Scottish Ministers exercised their powers under section 25 of the Further and Higher Education (Scotland) Act 2005 to direct the Scottish Funding Council to provide institution-specific funding. Ministers stated that the decision reflected the exceptional importance of the University of Dundee to higher education, medical research and the economy of Dundee and the surrounding region, while emphasising that future funding would remain conditional upon continued progress with governance reform and financial recovery.

=== Recovery and restructuring ===
Following publication of the Gillies Report and the appointment of Professor Nigel Seaton as Interim Principal and Vice-Chancellor, the University began implementing a Strategy to Recovery aimed at restoring financial sustainability, strengthening governance and reshaping its academic and professional services structures.

The recovery programme included substantial reductions in expenditure, reforms to governance and financial management, and two voluntary severance schemes conducted during 2025 and 2026. Between 1 August 2024 and 1 May 2026, the University's staff headcount reduced by 675. Despite these reductions, the University stated that it still needed to achieve a further £20 million in annual savings. On 16 June 2026 it began collective consultation on proposals to reduce staffing by approximately 190 further full-time equivalent posts, divided broadly equally between academic and professional services staff, with compulsory redundancies remaining possible if sufficient voluntary savings could not be achieved.

The restructuring also involved significant organisational and academic change. The University reorganised its eight academic schools into four academic faculties and restructured its professional services. As part of a wider review of its academic portfolio, it proposed suspending degree programmes in Mathematics, Languages and Philosophy while ensuring that existing students could complete their degrees and continuing mathematics teaching in support of other disciplines.

As of July 2026, the University remained engaged in a multi-year programme of financial recovery under the oversight of the Scottish Funding Council. The recovery programme continued to focus on implementing the recommendations of the Gillies Report, restoring long-term financial sustainability and rebuilding confidence in the University's governance and leadership.

== Campus ==
=== City Campus ===
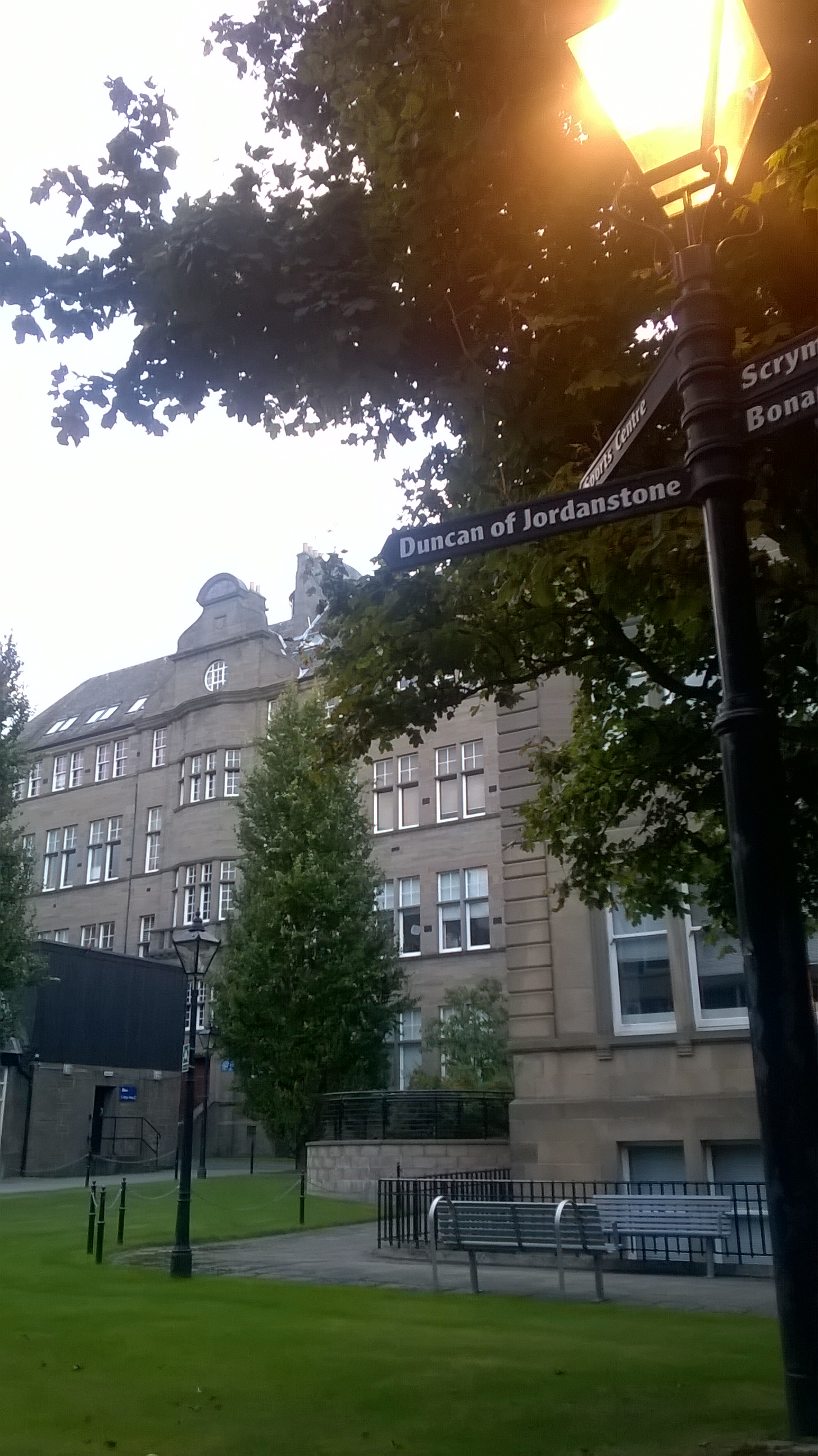
The Old Medical School and the Carnelley Building on City Campus.

The main campus is within the West End of the City of Dundee. It has expanded greatly since the university gained independence, from just four converted buildings when the University College was founded in 1881 the university has grown to consist of over fifty at present. However, many buildings survive from Dundee's period as a university college and as a constituent college of St Andrews University. The earliest purpose-built facility on campus was the Carnelley Building which opened in 1883 as part of the new University College. A £10,000 donation from Mary Ann Baxter provided for a chemistry laboratory situated in the building which was named for the university's first professor of chemistry, Thomas Carnelley.

==== Geddes Quadrangle ====
The buildings at the heart of the university form the Geddes Quadrangle. These include the Carnegie, Harris and Peters Buildings which were constructed in 1909 as part of the new college of the University of St Andrews. The Geddes Quadrangle was named for Patrick Geddes, a pioneering thinker in the fields of sociology and urban planning and former professor of botany at Dundee, as a botanist Geddes had originally proposed a garden in the center of the quadrangle to be used for teaching purposes. The designer was Victorian architect Robert Rowand Anderson, the architect of buildings such as the Scottish National Portrait Gallery and Mount Stuart House.

==== Post-war buildings ====
Amid the expansion of education in post-war Britain, the University College, Dundee commissioned the construction of several new buildings to cope with the increasing numbers of students and academics arriving. The first of these was the Ewing Building which had started planning in 1950 and was officially opened in 1954. Named after Sir James Alfred Ewing, the university's first professor of engineering. The Fulton Building gave the civil and mechanical engineering department a dedicated building, it was opened in 1964 and took its name from Angus Robertson Fulton, former principal of University College, Dundee (1939–1946).

The 1960s saw the further development of the Queen's College campus with some of the earliest multi-story towers in Scotland being built for both teaching and student accommodation. The Tower Building, opened in 1961 by Queen Elizabeth the Queen Mother, exemplified early Scottish modernist architecture and was designed by Robert Matthew; it stands 140 ft tall with ten storeys home to both academic, executive and administrative departments of the university. The Tower was built on the site of two of the original four Georgian houses which had housed University College, Dundee (originally known as Whiteleys). Its construction was notable as it was the tallest structure built in Dundee since the Old Steeple in the medieval period. The building was extended in the later 1960s was resulted in the demolition of the remaining two original buildings.

Belmont Halls of Residence took inspiration from Danish design and aimed to provide modern, spacious quarters for students while keeping costs cheap; it was completed in 1963 on the site of Belmont Works, a former jute mill.

==== Recent developments ====
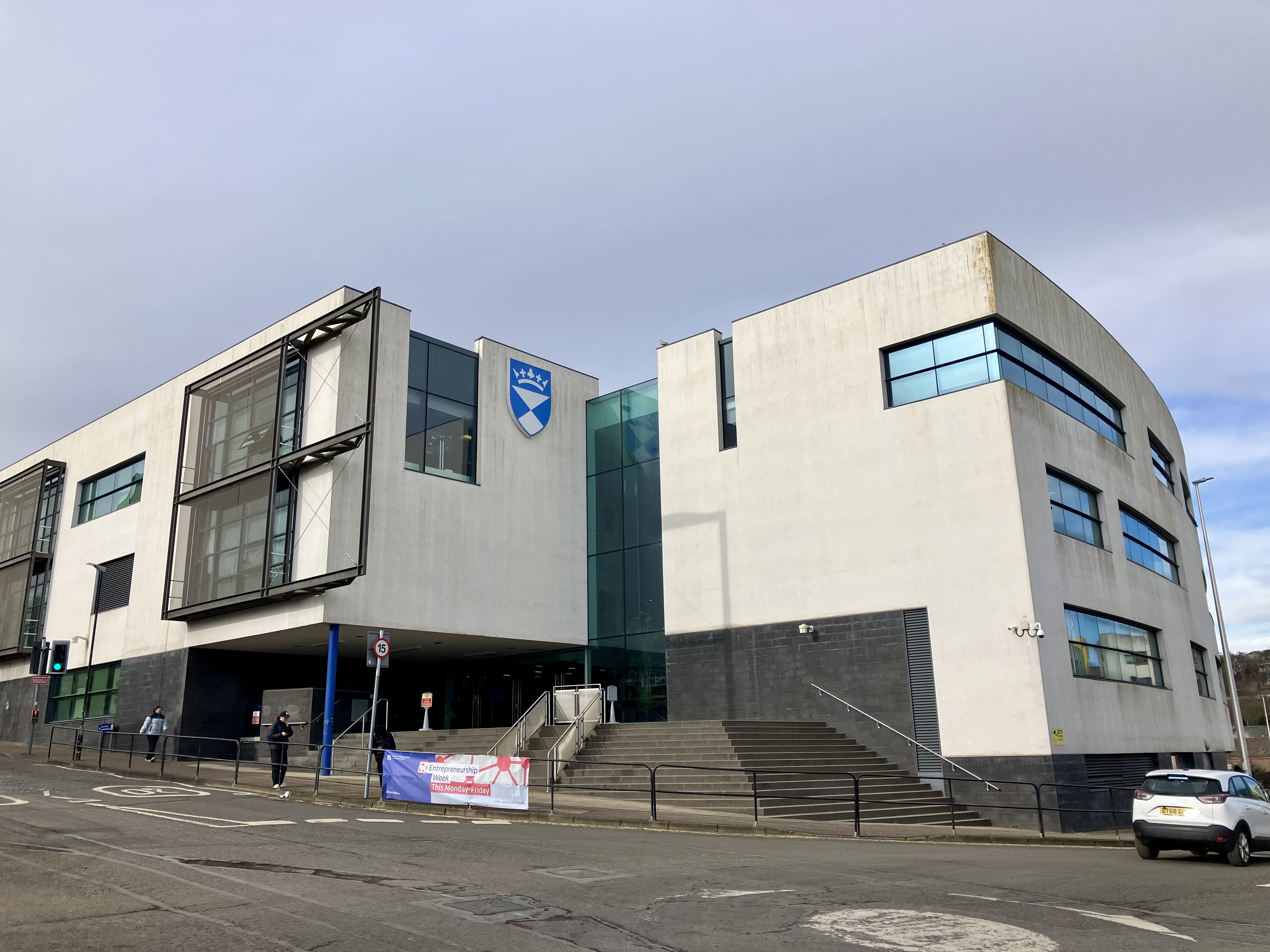
Dalhousie Building

The 2000s brought extensive renovation to the university's central campus, with a number of new and upgraded buildings introduced around 2007 to celebrate the 40th anniversary of the university's independence. Large extensions have been placed on the Main Library and sports centre, and a number of new halls of residence (Heathfield, Belmont, West Park and Seabraes) have been gradually phased into operation. The Dalhousie building was erected during this period as dedicated teaching accommodation for the university, in part replacing space previously at the Gardyne Road campus of Northern College, which has now been taken up by Dundee College. Significant improvement works have taken place in old buildings such as the Old Technical Institute, Medical Sciences Institute and Old Medical School buildings.

=== Kirkcaldy Campus ===
The School of Nursing and Health Sciences has a campus on Forth Avenue, Kirkcaldy, Fife. This offers degrees in nursing, midwifery and other health-related subjects. Placements are available often in conjunction with NHS Fife.

== Governance and organisation ==
=== Governance ===
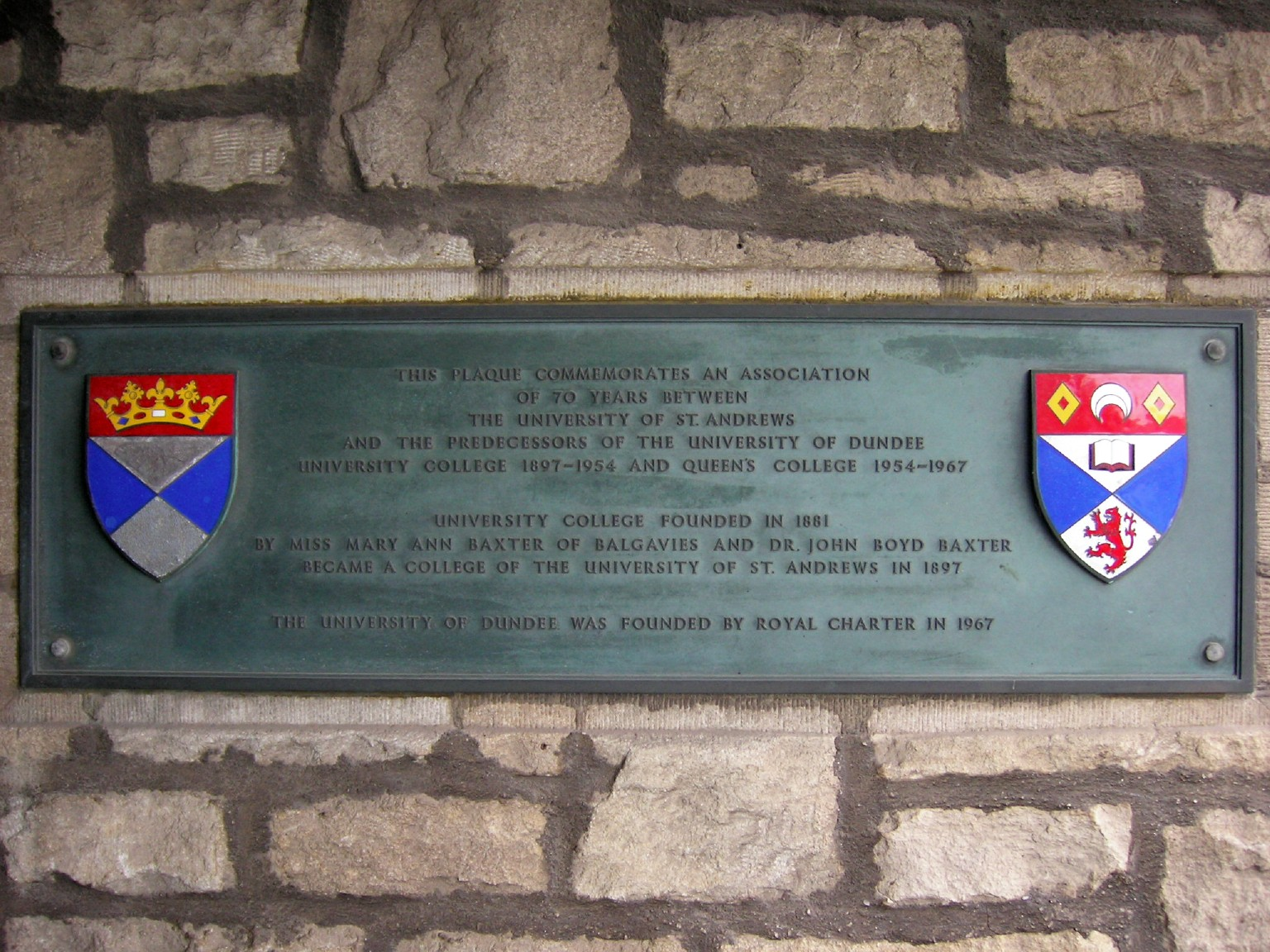
Plaque celebrating Dundee's relationship with the University of St Andrews.

The University of Dundee is organised under the provisions of its royal charter, which granted the university its independence in 1967. Dundee, uniquely outside of the four ancient universities of Scotland has a governance framework which shares a number of similarities with the ancient governance structure which was developed in the 19th and 20th centuries through the various Universities (Scotland) Acts.

==== Chancellor ====
The chancellor is the head of the university and president of the Graduates' Council, with a role of presiding over academic ceremonies such as graduations. The six chancellors of the university to have held office since its independence are:

- Queen Elizabeth the Queen Mother (1967–1977)
- Simon Ramsay, 16th Earl of Dalhousie (1977–1992)
- Sir James W. Black (1992–2006)
- Narendra Patel, Baron Patel (2006–2017)
- Dame Jocelyn Bell Burnell (2018–2023)
- George Robertson, Baron Robertson of Port Ellen (2023-)

==== Rector ====
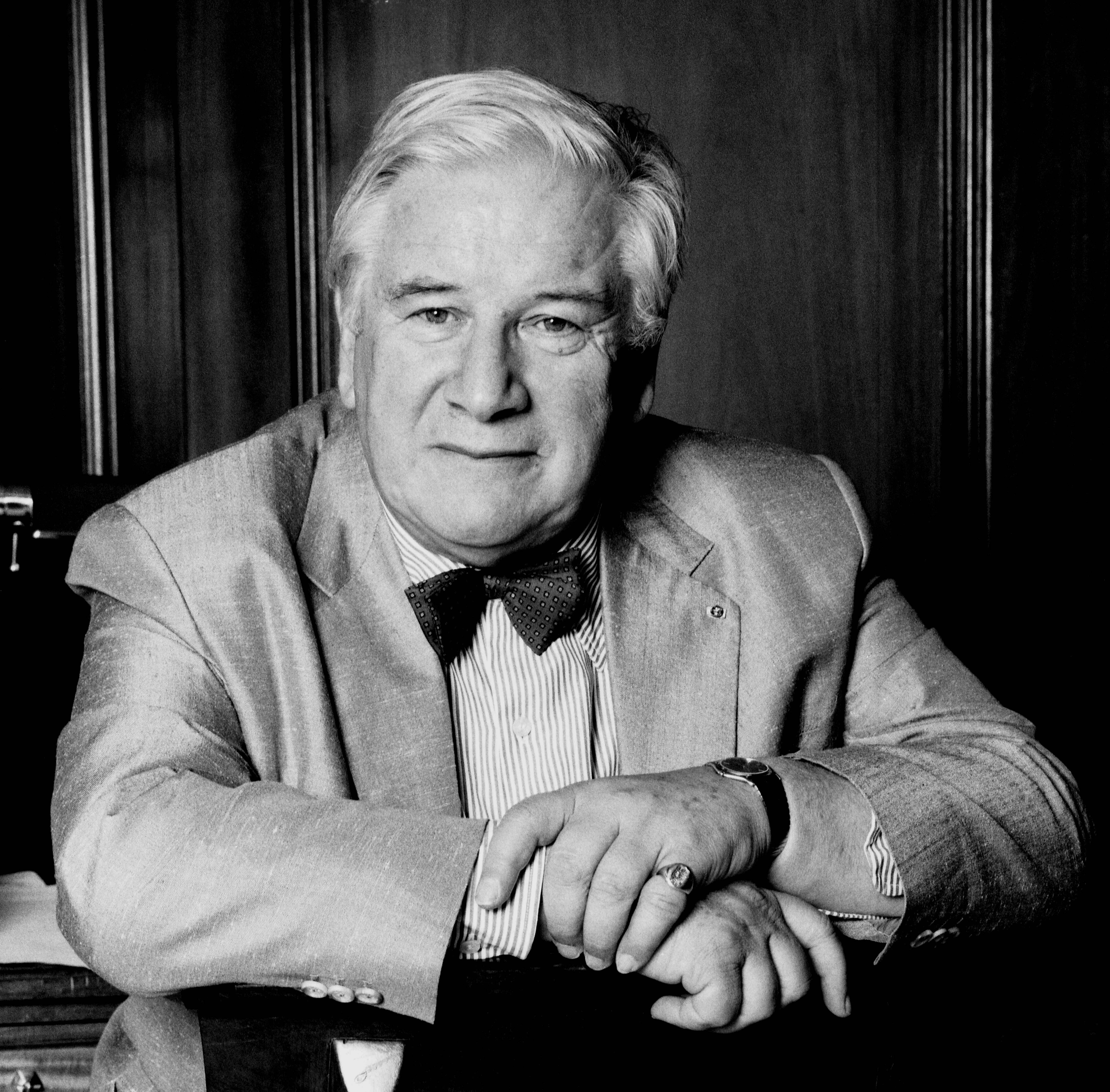
Sir Peter Ustinov, first Rector of the university.

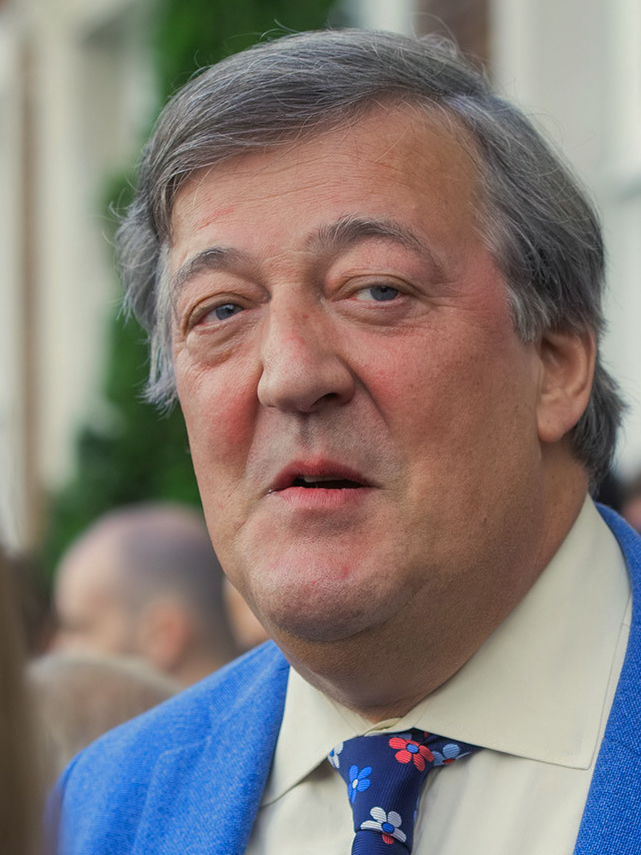
Stephen Fry was elected rector of the university in 1992. He spent six years as rector and the students' representative on the governing body.

The rector of the university is an official elected by the matriculated students of the university for a three-year term. In common with other university rectors in Scotland, the position is largely ceremonial, although it does involve the representation of students on the University Court. The rector at Dundee, unlike that of the ancient universities, does not chair the University Court, that duty instead falling to a lay member. The rector may appoint an assessor who can carry out the rector's functions on their behalf when they are absent. The university gained national attention in 2001 when it seemed that actor David Hasselhoff may stand as rector.

As part of the process of installation, the students traditionally take the new rector on the 'rectorial drag' which involves them being 'dragged' from Dundee City Chambers to the university in the university's own carriage visiting on the way some of the many pubs in the city as part of the informal welcome to the university.

The present holder of the position is Maggie Chapman MSP, who was elected and took up the post in 2025. She replaced artist manager, Keith Harris, who in turn replaced sports broadcaster Jim Spence, who was installed in 2019 but did not serve a full term partly due to changes in personal circumstances as a result of COVID-19. Prior to Spence, the rector was Mark Beaumont, the record-breaking endurance cyclist.

Previous rectors since the university's independence have included Sir Peter Ustinov, Sir Clement Freud, and Stephen Fry, who each served two terms, and Craig Murray, Tony Slattery, Lorraine Kelly and Fred MacAulay, who each served one.

==== Principal and vice-chancellor ====
The principal and vice-chancellor is the chief academic and administrative officer of the university, presiding over the Senatus Academicus. As a result of their title as vice-chancellor, the principal can fulfill the duties of the chancellor in their absence.

Following the announced resignation of Principal and Vice-Chancellor Sir Pete Downes in February 2018, the university appointed Andrew Atherton to the post, who took office in January 2019. Atherton resigned in November 2019 following a dispute with the university.

David Maguire was appointed Interim Principal and Vice-Chancellor in January 2020 pending the appointment of a permanent successor. Iain Gillespie took office as Principal and Vice-Chancellor in January 2021. Gillespie resigned in December 2024 during the university's financial crisis.

Shane O'Neill served as Interim Principal and Vice-Chancellor until June 2025, when he resigned following publication of the Gillies Report into the university's financial governance. Nigel Seaton was appointed Interim Principal and Vice-Chancellor later that month to lead the university's recovery programme.

Holders of this position and its predecessors are:

===== Principals of University College, Dundee =====
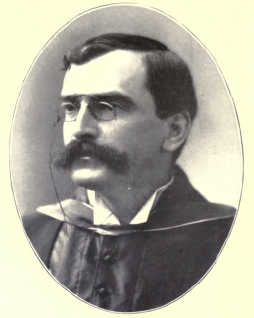
William Peterson served as the inaugural Principal of University College, Dundee

- William Peterson (1882–1895)
- John Yule Mackay (1895–1930)
- Sir James Irvine (1930–1939) – 'Interim' appointment
- Angus Robertson Fulton (1939–1946) – 'Interim' appointment
- Douglas Wimberley (1946–1954)

===== Masters of Queen's College, Dundee =====
- David Rutherford Dow (1954–1958)
- Arthur Alexander Matheson (1958–1966)
- James Drever (1966–1967)

===== Principals of the University of Dundee =====
- James Drever (1967–1978)
- Adam Neville (1978–1987)
- Michael Hamlin (1987–1994)
- Ian James Graham-Bryce (1994–2000)
- Sir Alan Langlands (2000–2009)
- Sir Pete Downes (2009–2018)
- Andrew Atherton (2019)
- David Maguire (2020) Interim Principal
- Iain Gillespie (2021–24)
- Shane O'Neill (2024-2025) interim principal
- Nigel Seaton (2025-2026 ) interim principal
- Angela Scott (2026-)

=== Structure ===
Following the university's 2024–25 financial crisis, the institution restructured from eight academic Schools to four academic Faculties during the 2025–26 academic year. The university was previously organised into eight schools containing multiple disciplines.

School of Art and Design

- Duncan of Jordanstone College of Art and Design

School of Business

- Accounting and Finance
- Economics
- Business, Management and Marketing

School of Dentistry

- Dentistry

School of Humanities, Social Sciences and Law

- Dundee Law School
- Education and Society
- Energy, Environment and Society
- Humanities
- Psychology

School of Life Sciences

- Life Sciences

School of Medicine

- Medicine

School of Health Sciences

- Adult Nursing
- Child Nursing
- Mental Health Nursing

School of Science and Engineering

- Anatomy and Human Identification
- Computing
- Engineering (Civil, Mechanical and Industrial, Biomedical)
- Mathematics
- Physics
- Graduate Apprenticeships

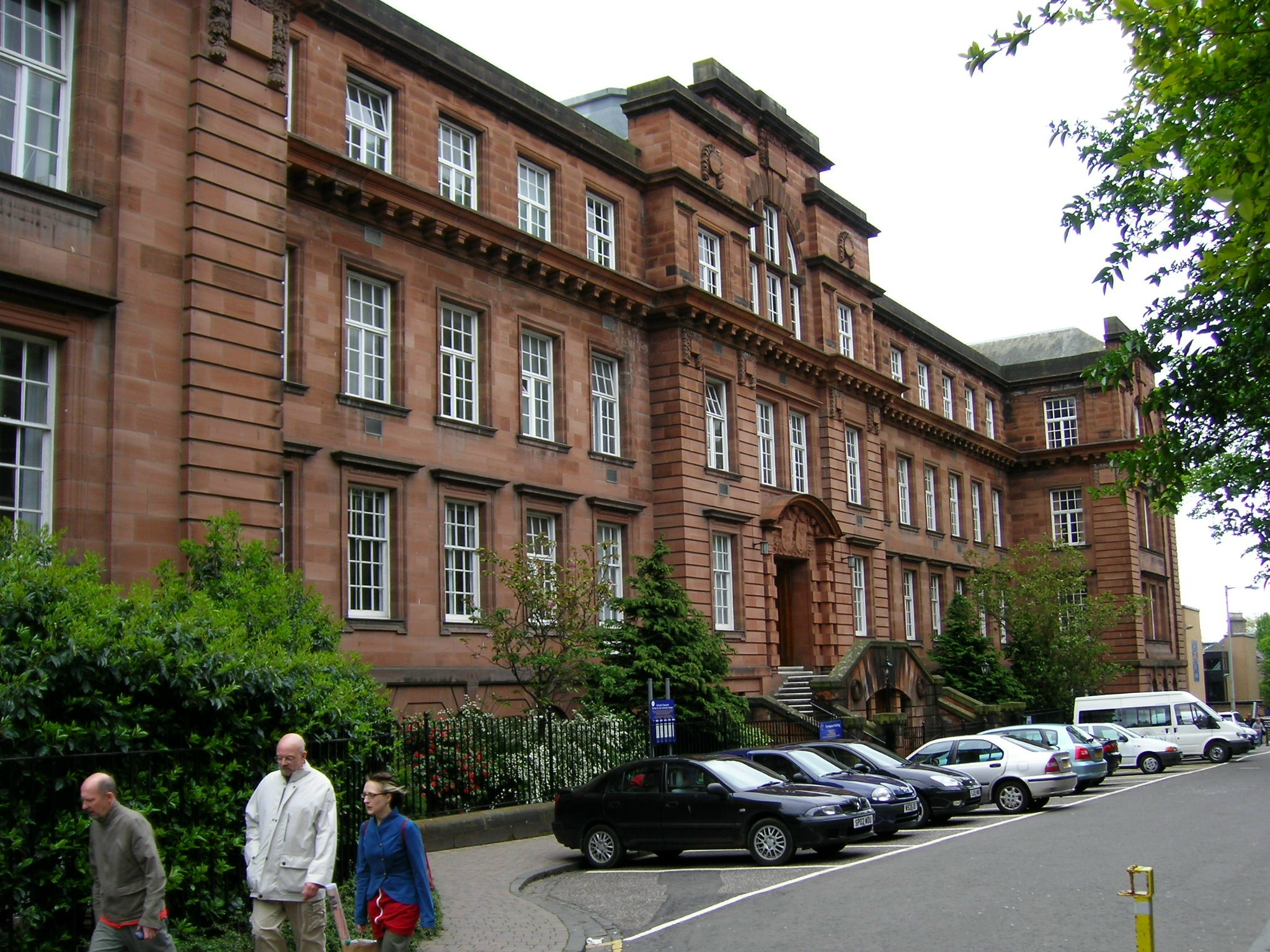
The Scrymgeour Building, which houses Law, Psychology and Politics

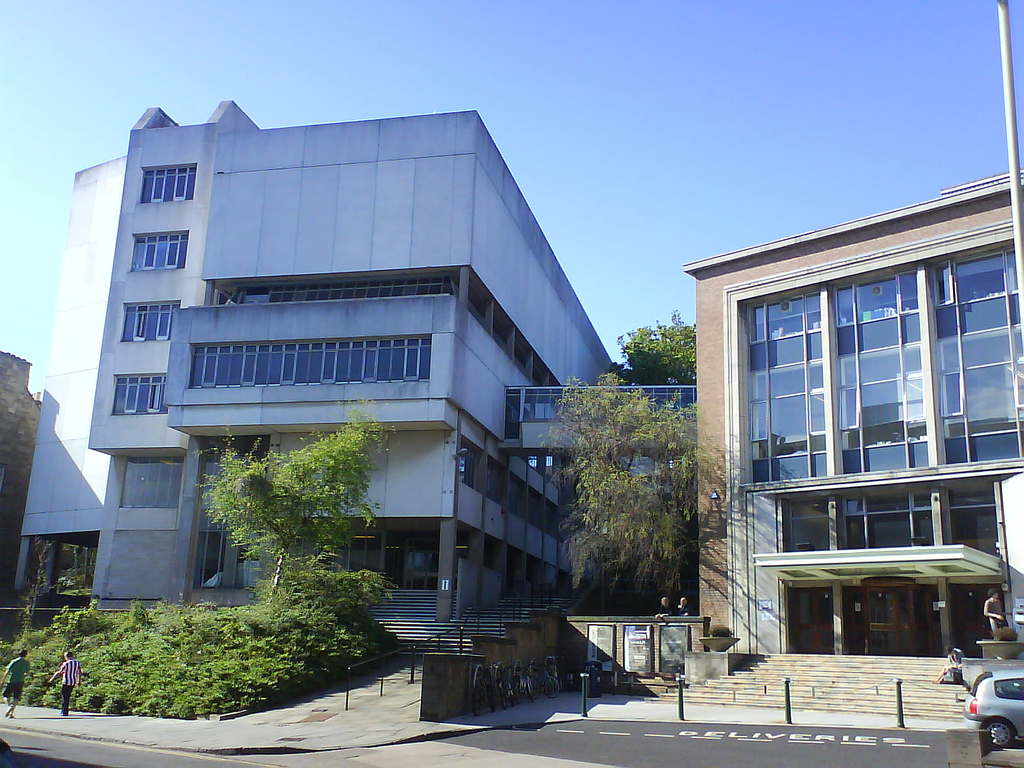
The Duncan of Jordanstone College of Art & Design

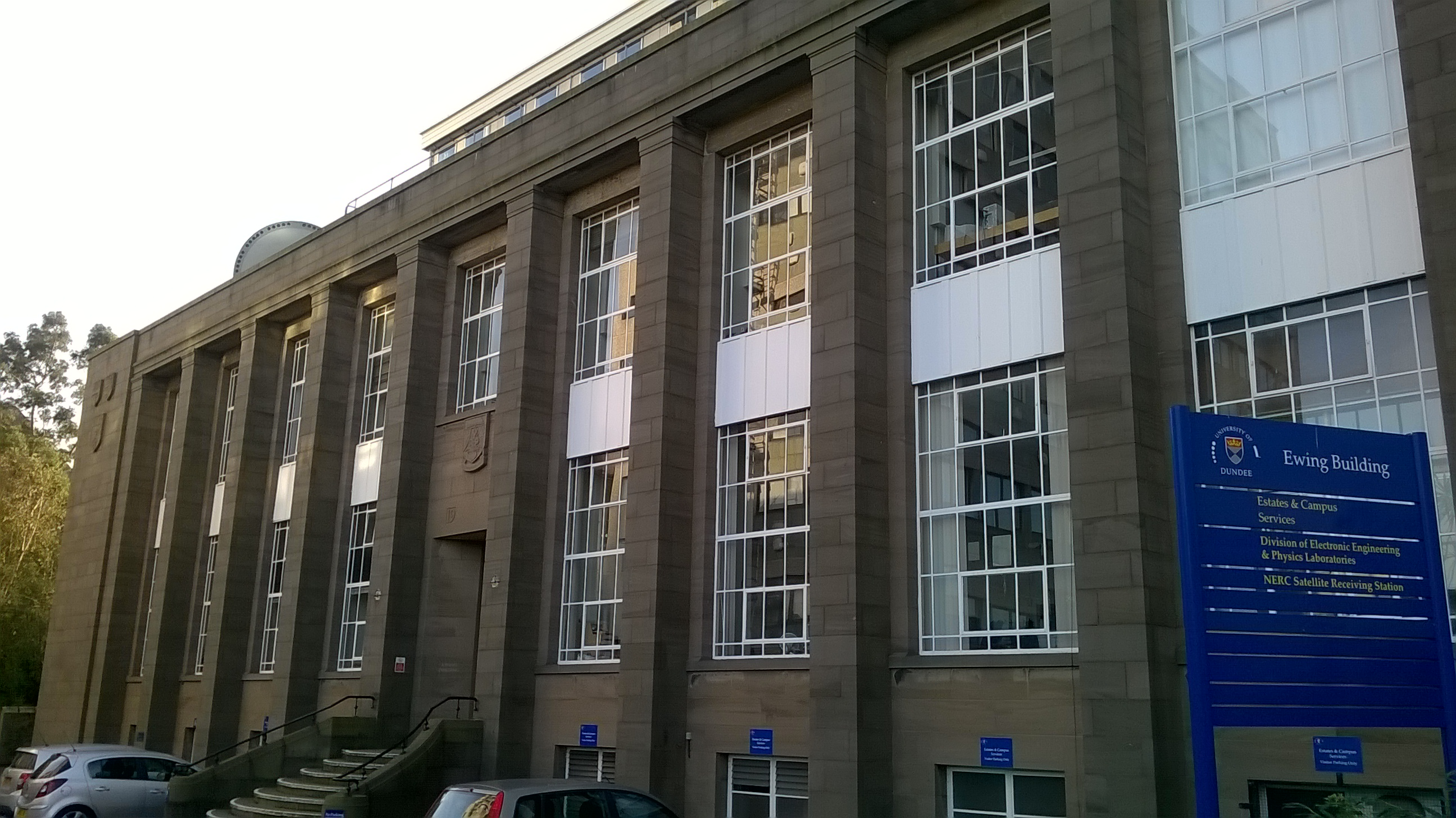
The Ewing Building, home to research forensics and Estates and Campus Services.

== Academic profile ==
=== Admissions ===
UCAS Admission Statistics
	2025	2024	2023	2022	2021
Applications (Note: Main scheme applications, International and UK)	16,990	16,630	16,665	18,640	19,905
Accepted	2,520	2,510	2,555	2,735	2,865
Applications/Accepted Ratio	6.7	6.6	6.5	6.8	6.9
Overall Offer Rate (%)	65.2	63.5	62.0	55.3	54.4
↳ UK only (%) (Note: UK domiciled applicants)	67.7	65.5	62.8	56.2	53.9
Average Entry Tariff	—N/a	—N/a	176	185	180
↳ Top three exams (Note: The maximum tariff score for three exams is 168: the equivalent of A*A*A* at A-Level, 777 at HL for the IB Diploma Programme, or AAA at Advanced Higher)	—N/a	—N/a	129.1	135.2	127.4

HESA Student Body Composition (2024/25)
Domicile and Ethnicity	Total
British White (Note: Not be confused solely with White British)	68%
British Ethnic Minorities (Note: Includes those who indicate that they identify as Asian, Black, Mixed Heritage, Arab or any other ethnicity except White.)	14%
International EU	2%
International Non-EU	18%
Undergraduate Widening Participation Indicators
Female	66%
Independent School	9%
Low Participation Areas (Note: Calculated from the Polar4 measure, using Quintile1, in England and Wales. Calculated from the Scottish Index of Multiple Deprivation (SIMD) measure, using SIMD20, in Scotland.)	7%

In the 2024/25 academic year, the student body consisted of 13,435 students, composed of 9,785 undergraduates and 3,650 postgraduate students. The university is designated as a 'high-tariff' institution, having previously been 'medium-tariff', by the Department for Education, with the average undergraduate entrant to the university in recent years amassing between 127–132 UCAS Tariff points in their top three pre-university qualifications. Based on 2022/23 HESA entry standards data published in domestic league tables, which include a broad range of qualifications beyond the top three exam grades, the average student at the University of Dundee achieved 185 points – the ninth highest in the United Kingdom.

=== Reputation and rankings ===
Rankings
National rankings
- Complete (2027): 25
- Guardian (2027): 21
- Times / Sunday Times (2027): 20

Global rankings
- ARWU (2026): 401–500
- QS (2027): 447=
- THE (2026): 301–350

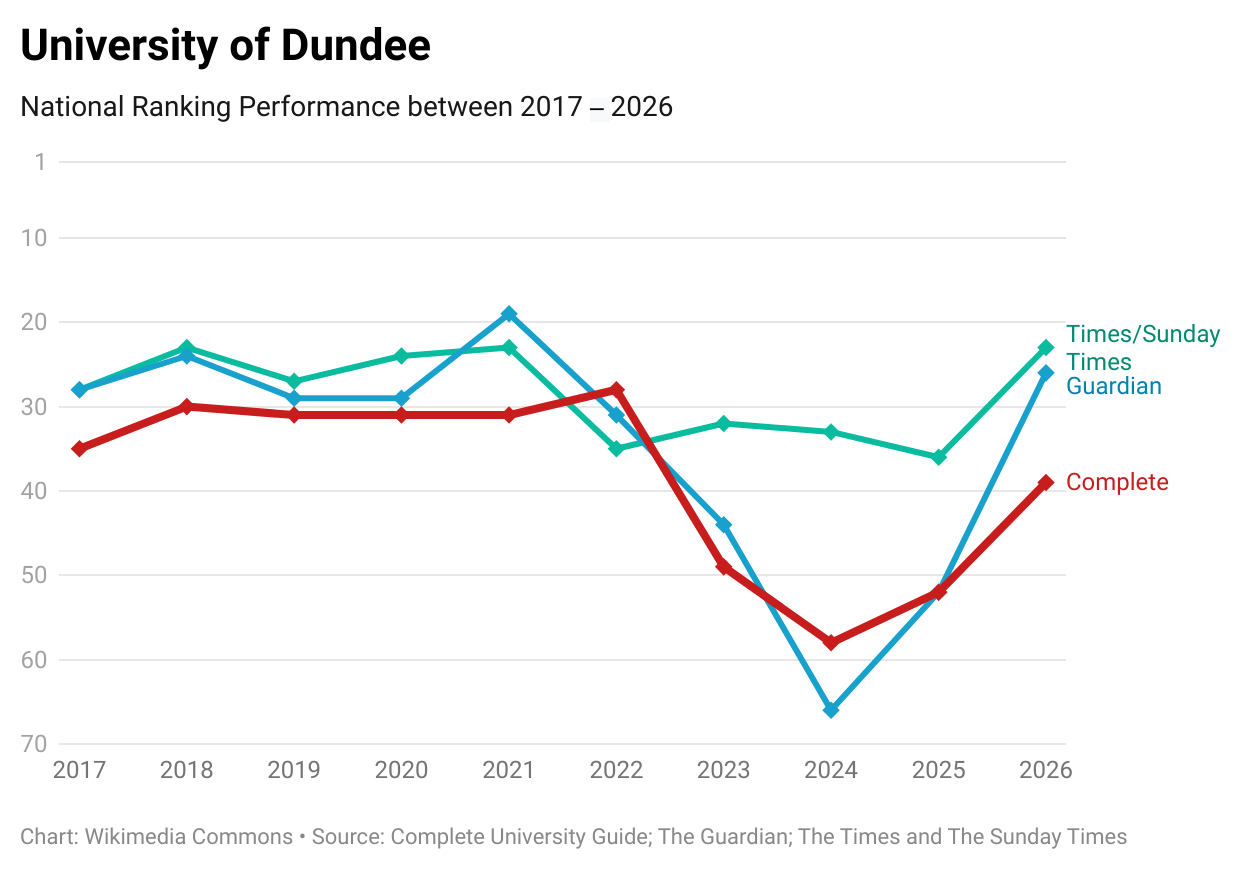
University of Dundee's national league table performance over the past ten years

As of 2025, Dundee is ranked within the top 500 universities in the world according to the major global rankings (Times, QS, and ARWU); placing 301-350th in the Times World University rankings, joint 428th in the QS World University Rankings and 301-400th in the Academic Ranking of World Universities. The university was The Times Good University Guide's "Scottish University of the Year" consecutively in 2015/16 and 2016/17.

=== Subject rankings ===
In both the 2021 and 2014 Research Excellence Framework which assesses research output between 2008 and 2020, the quality of research for Biological Sciences at Dundee is ranked 2nd in the United Kingdom by GPA, behind only the specialist Institute of Cancer Research. According to the 2024 Times Higher Education World University Rankings by Subject, Dundee's strongest subjects are Life Sciences, ranked in the top 125 in the world and Law, ranked in the top 150 in the world. The 2023 QS World University Rankings by Subject ranks the university in the top 200 in the world for Pharmacy & Pharmacology, Biological Sciences, Art & Design, Nursing, and Medicine.

In the 2024 Guardian university rankings in the UK, Dundee's subject offerings in Dentistry (3rd in UK, 1st in Scotland), and Computer science and information systems (9th in UK, 3rd in Scotland) rank within the top ten nationally. In 2023/2024 Anatomy & Physiology, Art and Design, Biological Sciences, Social Work and Medicine rank within the top ten nationally in at least one of the rankings. Dundee is also ranked 2nd for Urban Planning, behind University of Cambridge.

== Student life ==
Students at Dundee are represented by the university's students' representative council and the rector in common with other universities in Scotland sharing the ancient organisational structure.

=== Students' Association ===
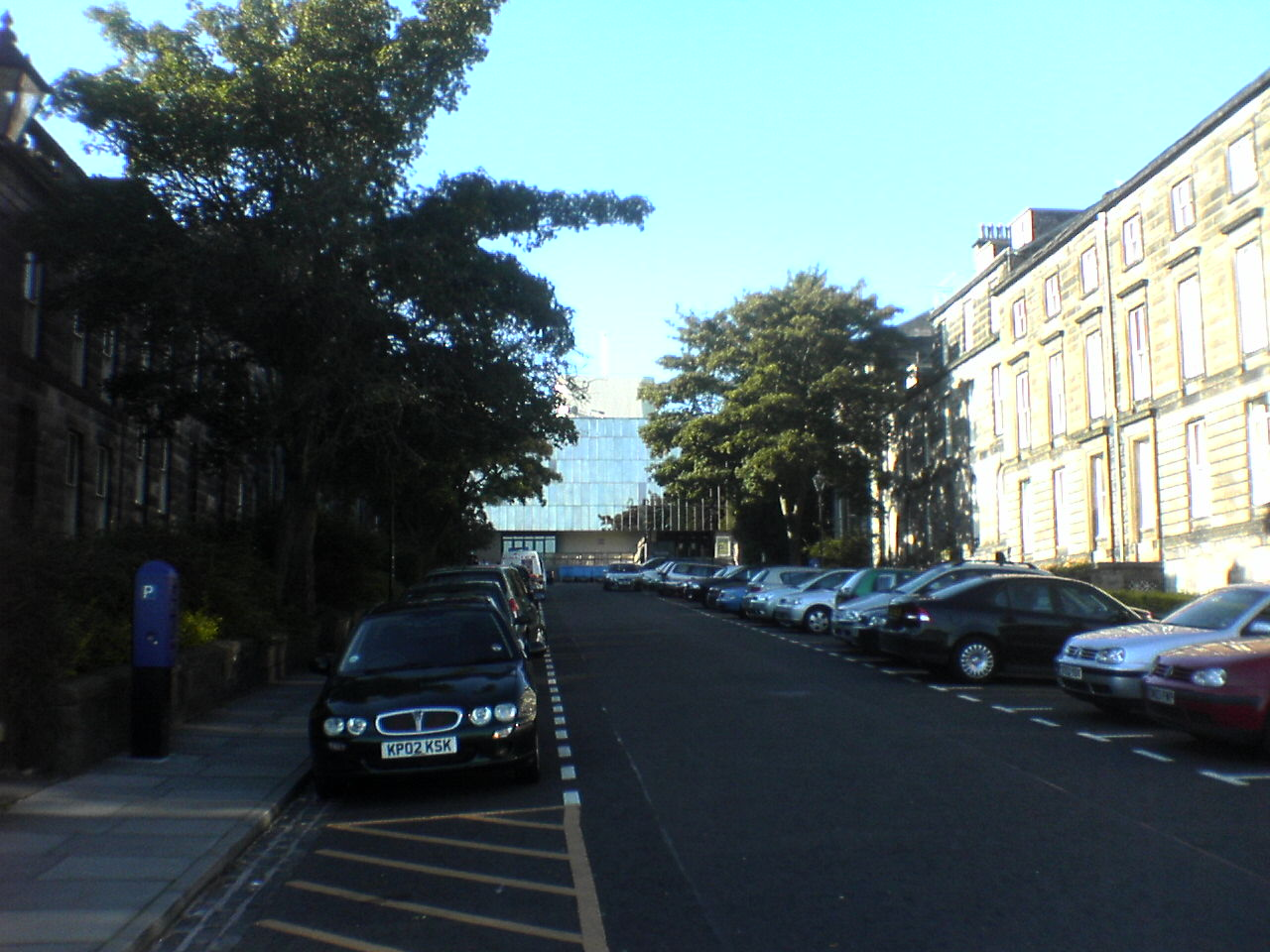
The present Students' Association building (top centre) and the University's Airlie Place

The Dundee University Students' Association (DUSA), unlike many other students' unions in the United Kingdom, is not affiliated to the National Union of Students, mainly due to cost concerns and political objections.

Membership of the Students' Association is automatic for all students of the university, although it is possible under statutes to renounce this membership at any time. The Association, as with the other ancient universities in Scotland, co-exists with the University's students' representative council.

The DUSA building is located in Airlie Place, in the centre of the University's Main Campus and caters as a private members' club offering bar, nightclub and refectory services for students. DUSA also provides a number of other typical students' union services such as advocacy on behalf of its membership and assistance to individual students. In addition the DUSA facilitates the creation of student societies, as of 2023 there are 240 student-led societies on campus. However, many of these amenities have been unavailable since 2023 due to the closure of much of the DUSA building because of concerns about RAAC

=== Sports facilities ===
As of 2026, there are 49 clubs affiliated with the Sports' Union, they are;

•Archery

• Athletics

•Badminton

• Men’s & Women’s Basketball

• Boat

• Boxing

•Canoe

• Cheerleading

• Cricket

• Curling

• Cycling

• Dance

• Equestrian

• Fencing

• Men’s and Women’s Football

• Men’s Futsal

• Men’s and Women’s Gaelic Football

• Golf

• Gymnastics

• Handball

• Men’s and Women’s Hockey

• Ice Skating

• Judo

• Karate

• Lacrosse

• Netball

• Pool

• Rucksack

• Men’s and Women’s Rugby

• Rugby Fives

• Sailing

• Shinty

• Ski and Snowboarding

• Squash

• Sub-aqua

• Surf

• Swimming and Waterpolo

• Taekwondo

• Tennis

• Trampoline

• Triathlon

• Ultimate Frisbee

• Volleyball

• Weightlifting

Other clubs, such as yoga, are affiliated with DUSA, not the sports union.

There is an annual award ceremony for the sports clubs, and a Blues & Colours Ball (see Blue (university sport)) to provide social interaction between the clubs.

Sport and Active Health (SpAH), unlike the Sports Union, is directly controlled by the university, but works closely with the students' organisations. Its chief building is located on Old Hawkhill in the main campus, which contains the main indoor sporting facilities and the university's gym.

Outdoor facilities are mainly based in the Riverside Sporting Ground, within a reasonable walking distance and bordering the Tay, although there are others – such as tennis courts – spread throughout the main campus. SpAH's 25m swimming pool is located within the Students' Association building on Airlie Place.

Notable sporting achievements of the university include winning the British University Gaelic football Championship in 1994 and being the first team in Scottish rugby history to win the league and SUS Cup double in the 2007/08 season.

=== Chaplaincy ===
The University Chaplaincy Centre was constructed in 1974 and extended in 1987 and houses both the University Chapel and a number of other related social facilities.

The university has a full-time chaplain, Fiona Douglas (since 1997), who is a minister of the Church of Scotland. There are also several part-time associate and honorary chaplains representing other faiths and denominations.

=== Traditions ===
Dundee students participate in a number of traditional events during the academic calendar. Towards the start of the year, a standard British Freshers' Week is organised, with a secondary one held when the university reconvenes after the Christmas vacation.

Traditions remaining from Dundee's days as a college of the University of St Andrews include the Gaudie Night (taking its name from the first line of the students' anthem, De Brevitate Vitae) – held early in the first semester and organised both as a Students' Union night and an event organised by the individual schools (for example by the Life Sciences, Medical, Law and Dentistry Societies) where students are assigned academic "parents" from the senior years and involves social events with games and drinking. Some weeks later, a Raisin (alternatively spelled "Raisen") or Revenge Gaudie is held, typically in the second semester, where students get to repay their academic parents' hospitality. Generally the school society-run events are more traditional in nature than the Students' Union event.

For 21 years (2004-2024), the university organised Discovery Days, a series of public talks from newly-appointed or promoted professors. The last Discovery Days event took place in January 2024. Inaugural lectures for new professors will be organised by the university's academic schools.

=== Student residences ===
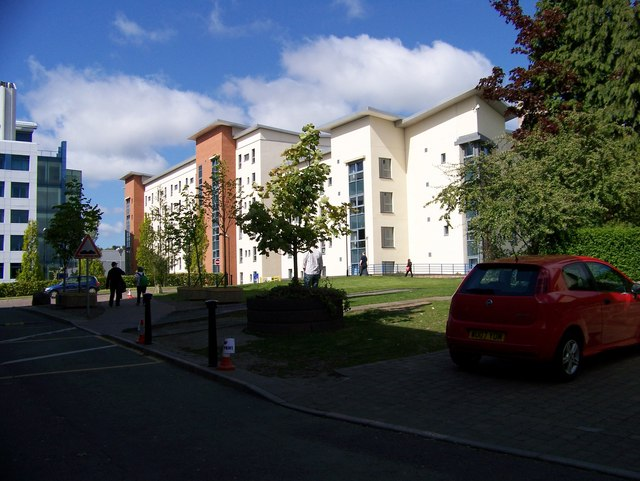
Example of on-campus student accommodation, opened in 2006

The university has a number of student residences spaced around the city. Over the last decade there has been an attempt to move some of these halls of residence closer to the main campus. With the closure and re-building of West Park Hall in 2005, all of the halls are now self catered en-suite.

At present, there are the following university residences:

- Belmont Tower (including Belmont Upper/Lower) – Based on the main campus and consisting of two main sections: Belmont Tower, opened in 1966, located on Mount Pleasant next to Belmont Quadrangle; and Belmont Upper and Lower, a long and low building connected to the tower, raised up on stilts to accommodate for car parking underneath for residences staff.
- Belmont Flats – Opened in 2006, these halls are of identical style to those of Heathfield and the new Seabraes halls. It is located on Old Hawkhill, across from the ISE and centred around Belmont Quadrangle.
- Heathfield – Built at the same time as Belmont Flats. It is located on Old Hawkhill, immediately across from Belmont Tower.
- Seabraes – A number of buildings containing flats, with a new hall identical in style to the new Heathfield and Belmont Halls being built at the foot of the complex. Located near to the south side of the main campus on Roseangle.
- West Park – Located some distance to the west of the main campus, these halls were traditionally popular with medicine students due to their proximity to Ninewells Hospital. Consists of a relatively new complex known as West Park Villas, which are essentially student flats. The old hall (separate from the Villas) was largely torn-down in 2005 (leaving behind only the listed parts of the building) and the new complex (generally known as 'West Park Flats' by the university) were made available from the start of the 2007/08 term.

Some older halls, despite remaining open in the interim until building works were finished, are now out of use – the last students moved out in early 2007. These are:

- Airlie Place & Springfield – A number of flats located in old terrace housing on the main campus, consisting of two streets mainly owned by the university. Both are architecturally noteworthy and have mostly been converted to offices.
- Peterson Hall – An almost brutalist style building to be found further down Roseangle from Seabraes. This hall was traditionally a non-smoking hall of residence, and is now ear-marked for private development.
- Wimberley Houses – The furthest university residences from the main campus, Wimberley – also the closest to Ninewells Hospital in the far west of the city. The residences themselves were a complex of buildings, each comprising a "house" which served as an independent flat for a number of students. They were named for Principal Douglas Wimberley.

== Historic collections ==
The university's cultural and historic collections are looked after by Museum Services and Archive Services.

=== Museum Services ===
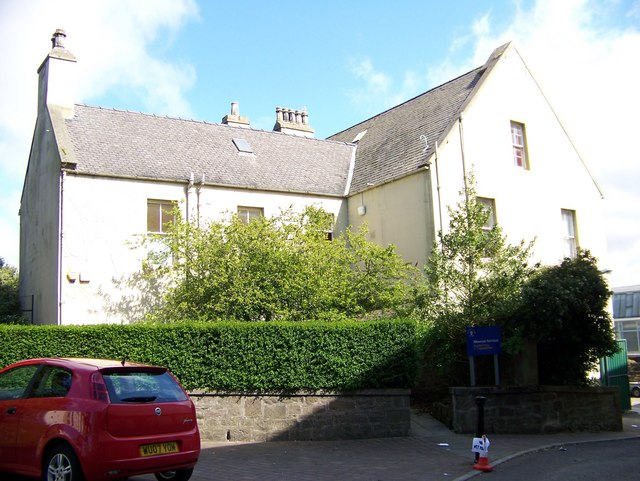
Hawkhill House provides offices for the university's museum service; it is the oldest building on campus, constructed as a farmhouse in the late 18th century.

Dundee has significant museum collections acquired over the 140 years of its history. These include fine art, design furniture, textiles, scientific instruments, medical equipment and natural history specimens. The collections are accredited as a public museum and are cared for by Museum Services. In 2012 it was announced that Museum Services had been awarded a grant of £100,000 by the Art Fund to develop an art collection inspired by D'Arcy Thompson. This body promotes the various departments of the university involved in cultural activity and runs an annual culture day of short public lectures. In January 2014 it was announced that Museum Services had been awarded funding of £32,407 to acquire a new object database to aid the management of its various collections of nearly 30,000 items.

=== Archive Services ===
The university's Archive Services was established in 1976 and maintains the University of Dundee's manuscripts and records collections. The archives hold a wide range of material relating to the university and its predecessor institutions and to individuals associated with the university. Archive Services also holds a number of records relating to individuals, businesses and organizations based in the Tayside area. The records held include a substantial number of business archives relating to the jute and linen industry in Dundee and West Bengal, records of other businesses including the archives of the Alliance Trust and the department store G. L. Wilson, the records of the Brechin Diocese of the Scottish Episcopal Church, the Michael Peto photographic collection and the NHS Tayside Archive. Archive Services' other collections include the archives of Dundee Repertory Theatre and the papers of the Great War poet Joseph Johnston Lee. In addition to material relating to the local area, the archives have a number of documents relating to other countries, especially India. The Archives also hold the records of the Glasite Church.

The archives also house some special book collections. These include rare books relating to local history and the Joan Auld Memorial Collection, an important collection of labour history books donated to the university in 1996 in memory of Joan Auld, the first university archivist, who had died in a climbing accident the previous year.

Archive Services also runs an ongoing oral history project to record the memories of individuals who have lived and worked in Dundee and hold public events to promote the project.

== Notable alumni and staff ==
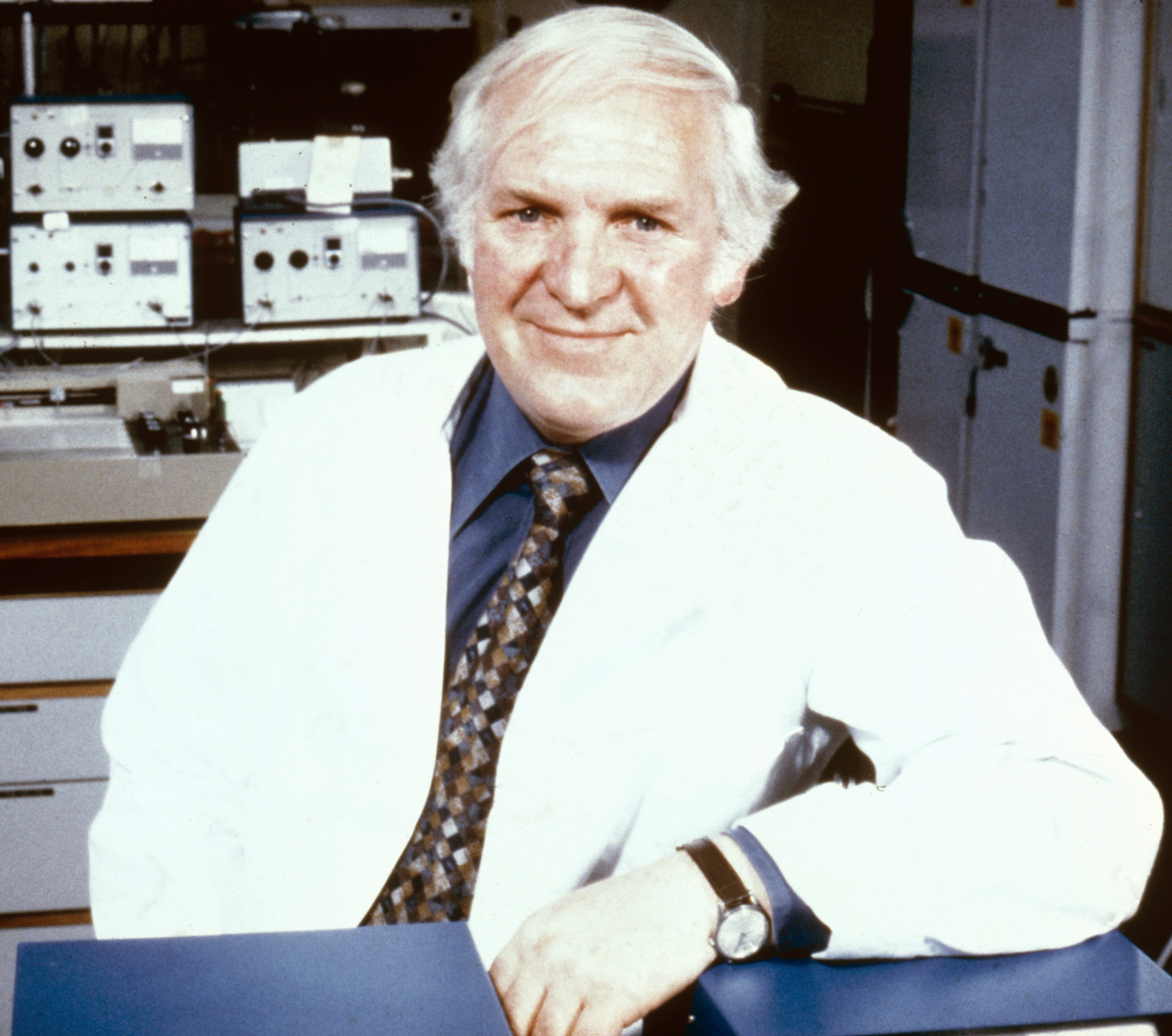
Sir James Black, pharmacologist and 1988 Nobel laureate

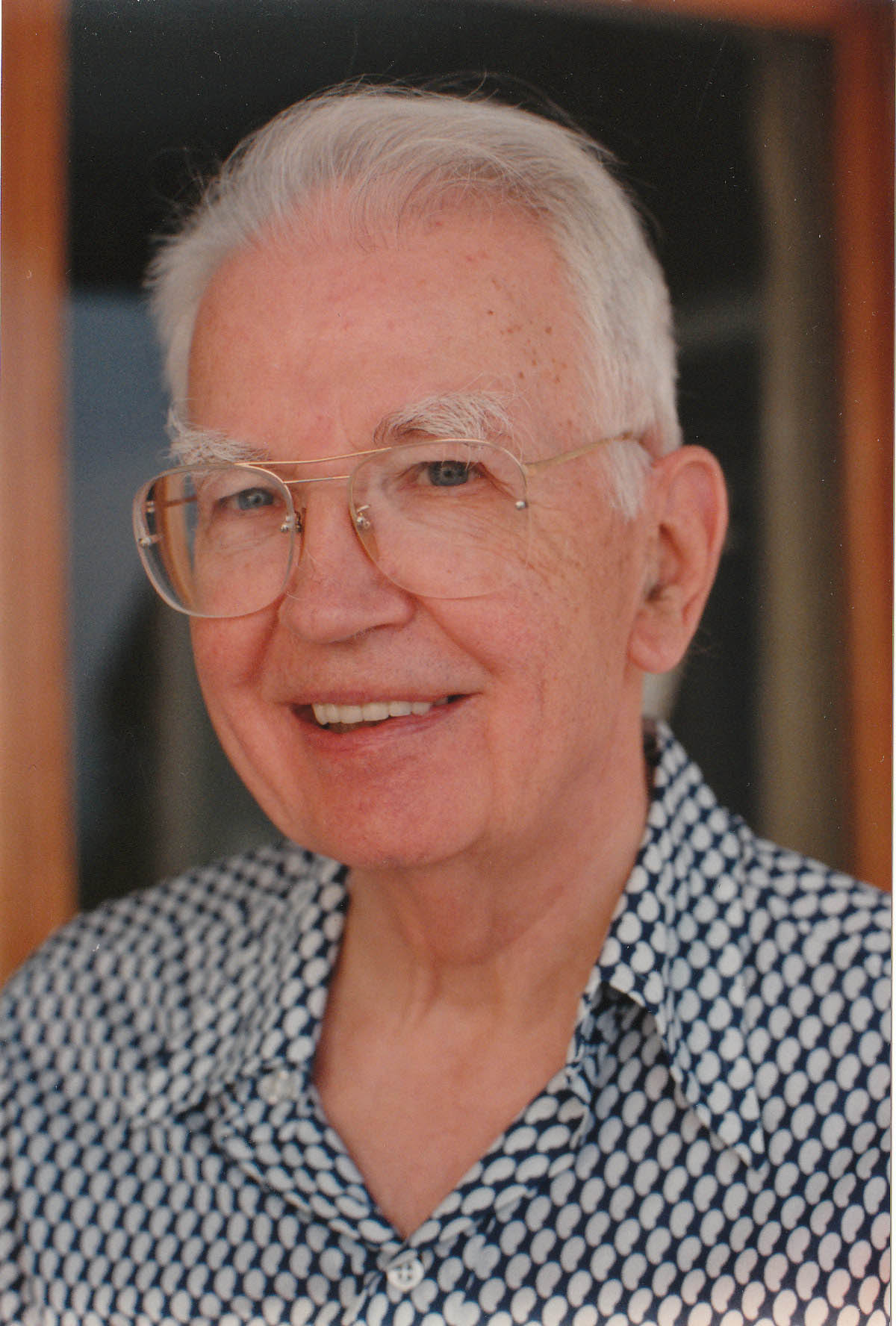
Ronald Coase, economist and 1991 Nobel laureate

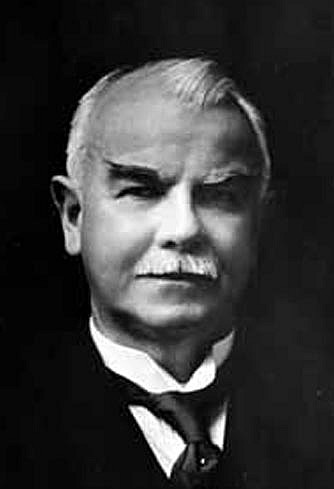
Sir James Alfred Ewing, physicist noted for his discovery of hysteresis

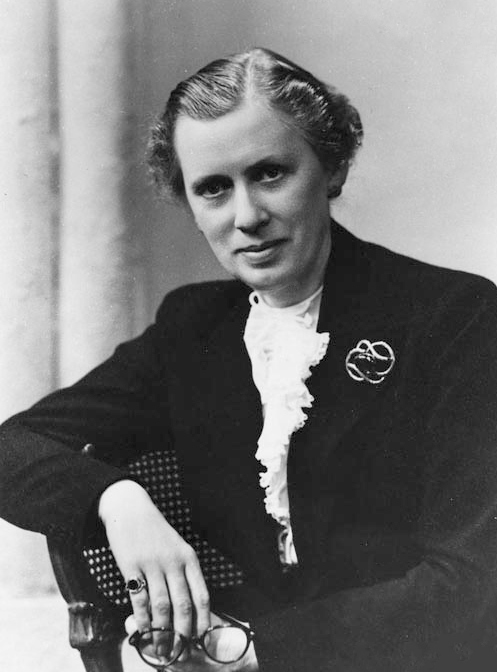
Margaret Fairlie, gynaecologist and Scotland's first female professor

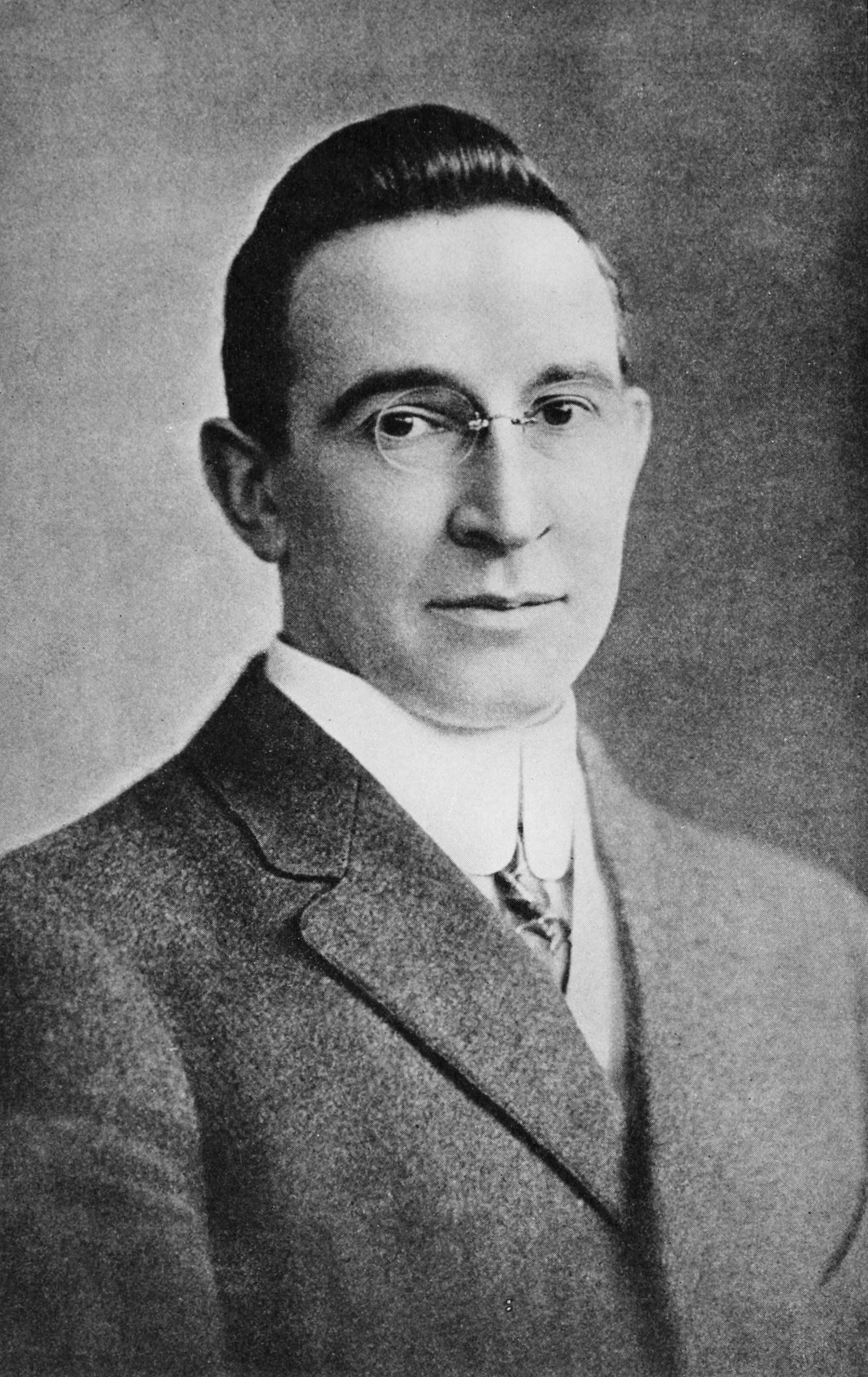
B.C. Forbes, financial journalist and founder of Forbes magazine

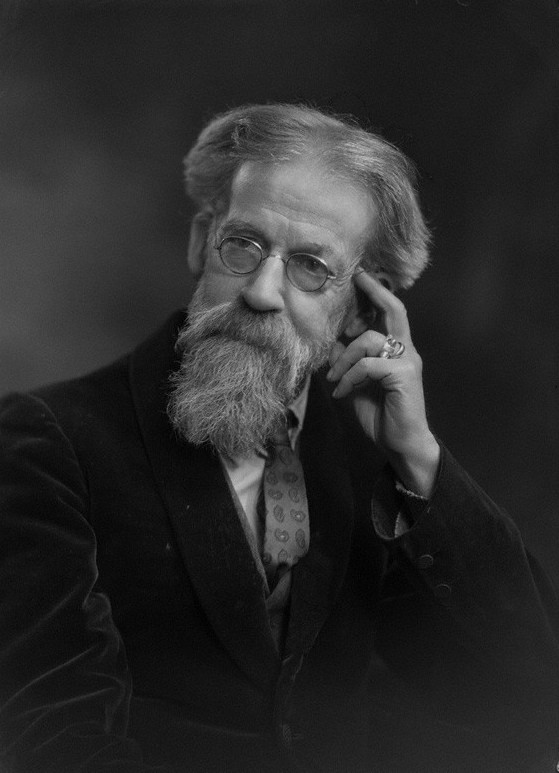
Sir Patrick Geddes, pioneering town planner and sociologist

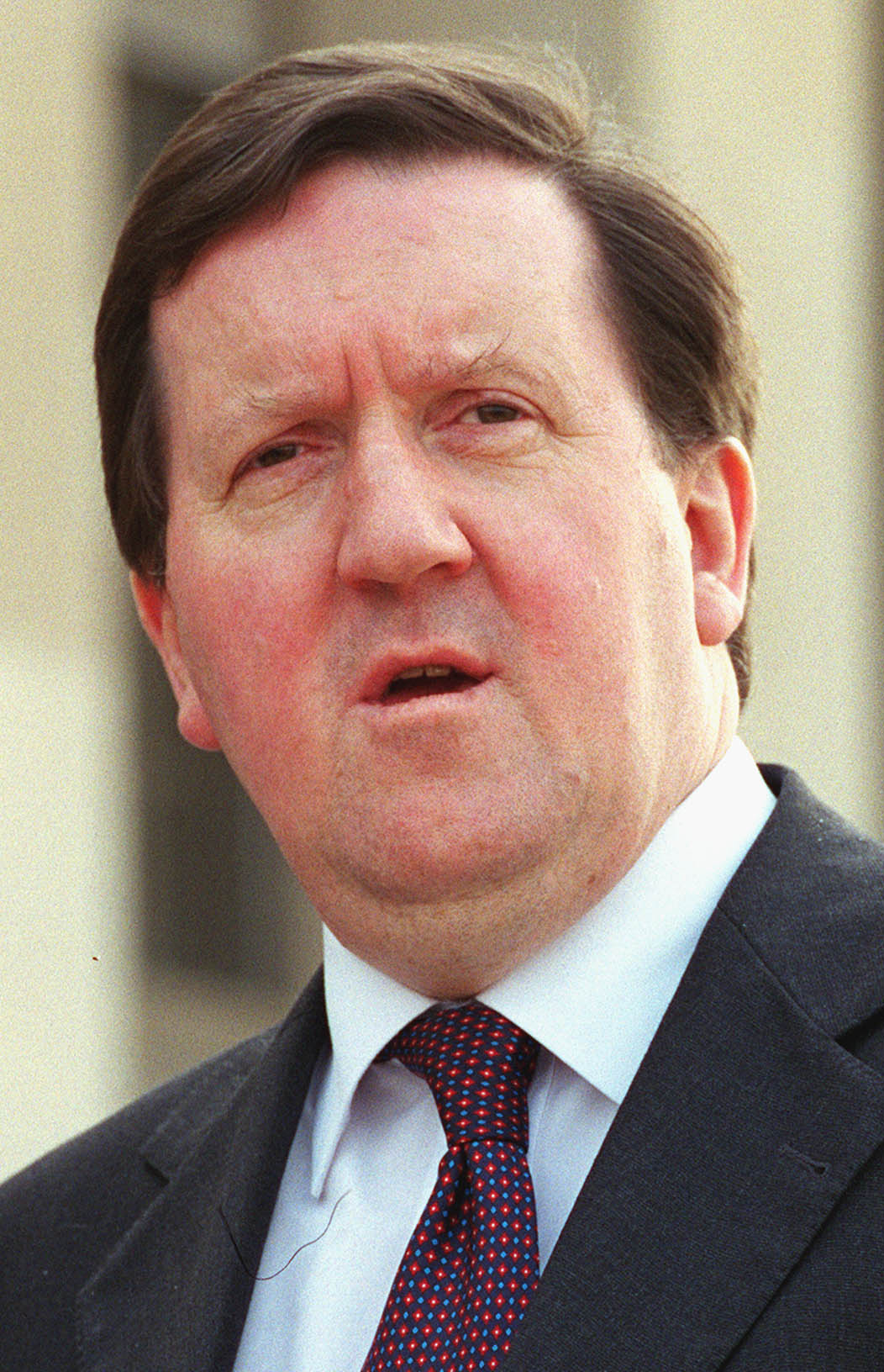
Lord Robertson, politician who served as tenth Secretary General of NATO

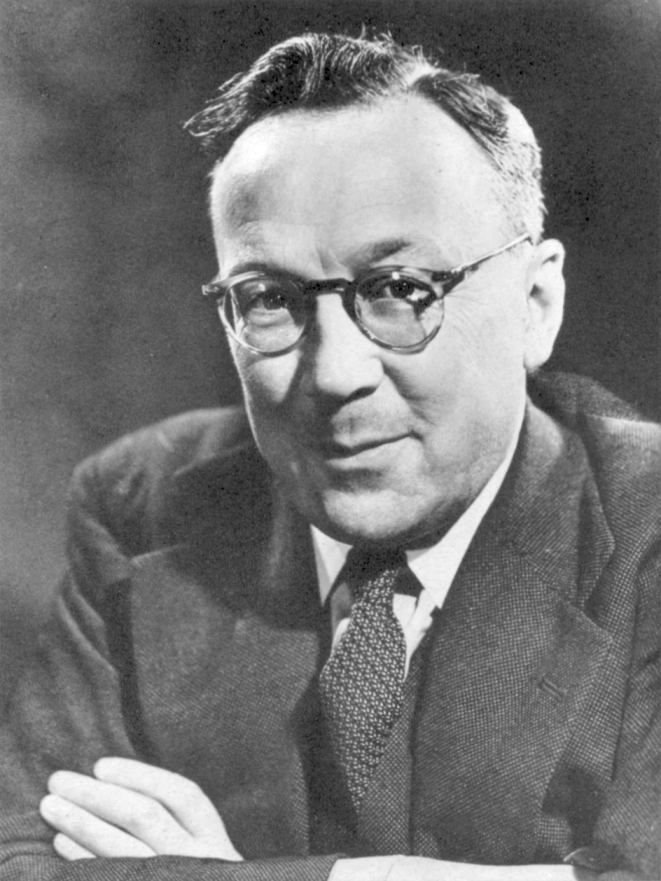
Sir Robert Watson-Watt, engineer known for his work in radar technology

This list includes certain persons who are graduates of the University of St Andrews, having studied at the University College or Queen's College in Dundee, as well as graduates of the University of Dundee. This is a result of the incorporation of this institution in the other from 1897 to 1967. Indeed, in a great many respects, the medical school at the University of Dundee is the direct inheritor of the medical traditions of the University of St Andrews. It also includes notable former members of staff of these institutions.

Former chancellor Sir James Black, who had studied medicine at the then University College Dundee, won the Nobel Prize for Medicine for his work on the discovery of propranolol – a beta-blocker for the treatment of hypertension. Ronald Coase served as a founding lecturer from 1932 to 1934 of the Dundee School of Economics and Commerce. Coase received the Nobel Prize in Economic Sciences in 1991 for his work on the significance of transaction costs and property rights for the institutional structure and functioning of the economy.

=== Business and economics ===
- Ahmed Adamu, Nigerian economist and first global chairperson of the Commonwealth Youth Council
- Sir Robert Horton, former chairman of BP and Railtrack
- Sir George Mathewson, Chairman of the Royal Bank of Scotland Group (2001–2006); Convenor of the Scottish Council of Economic Advisers (2007–2011)
- Sanusi Ohiare, Nigerian economist and former executive director of Nigeria's Rural Electrification Fund (2017-2023)

=== Media and the arts ===
- Johanna Basford, illustrator
- Naetochukwu Chikwe (Naeto-C), musician
- B. C. Forbes, founder of Forbes magazine
- Holly Hamilton, BBC journalist and presenter
- David Jackson, musician, best known for his involvement in Van der Graaf Generator
- Alan Johnston, BBC correspondent based in Gaza, famously kidnapped in 2007
- Gary Lightbody, lead singer of Snow Patrol
- Fred MacAulay, comedian and former rector of the university
- James McIntosh, food writer
- Graham Phillips, pro-Kremlin journalist covering the Russian invasion of Ukraine
- Karine Polwart, folk musician
- Carla Romano, GMTV reporter
- John Suchet, Channel Five news anchor, formerly of ITN

==== Artists ====
- Calum Colvin
- Luke Fowler, 2012 Turner Prize Nominee
- David Mach, 1988 Turner Prize Nominee
- Lucy McKenzie
- Lewis Deeney
- Susan Philipsz, 2010 Turner Prize
- Thomson & Craighead
- Louise Wilson (of Jane and Louise Wilson) 1999 Turner Prize Nominees

=== Politics ===
- John Peter Amewu, Member of Parliament, Parliament of Ghana; and Minister for Railways Development, Ghana
- Malcolm Bruce, former Liberal Democrat Member of Parliament, Rector of the university (1986–89)
- Christopher Chope, Member of Parliament, former minister of state and barrister
- Lynda Clark, Baroness Clark of Calton, former member of parliament and Advocate General for Scotland, now Senator of the College of Justice
- Chris Clarkson, Conservative member of parliament
- William Cullen, Baron Cullen of Whitekirk, advocate, judge, Lord Justice General and Lord President of the Court of Session as well as life peer
- Kurt Deketelaere, secretary-general of the League of European Research Universities
- Frank Doran, former Labour member of parliament
- Kevin Dunion, Scottish Information Commissioner between 2003 and 2012, as well as former Lord Rector of the University of St Andrews
- Maurice Golden, Conservative member of the Scottish Parliament
- Boaz Kipchumba Kaino, former MP and assistant minister of lands and settlement. Republic of Kenya
- Geoffrey Aori Mabea, first executive secretary of the Energy Regulators Association of East Africa
- Finlay Macdonald, retired minister and principal clerk to the General Assembly of the Church of Scotland
- Jenny Marra, member of Scottish Parliament, attended Dundee to read the Diploma in Professional Legal Practice
- Paul Masterton, former Conservative MP and solicitor
- Bruce Millan, Labour MP, Secretary of State for Scotland and European Commissioner for Regional Policy
- Lewis Moonie, Baron Moonie – Labour politician, former minister of state
- Claude Moraes, former Commissioner for Racial Equality, former member of the European Parliament
- Craig Murray, former British ambassador to Uzbekistan, former president of DUSA, former rector of the university
- Elijah Ngurare, Prime Minister of Namibia and the secretary general of the SWAPO Party Youth League
- Nhial Deng Nhial, Minister of Foreign Affairs for the Republic of South Sudan
- Alex Neil, Scottish National Party MSP, Cabinet Secretary for Health and Wellbeing
- George Robertson, Baron Robertson of Port Ellen, former secretary-general of NATO, Labour MP and UK Secretary of State for Defence
- John Stevenson, Conservative MP and solicitor
- Brian Wilson, former Labour MP and Minister of State

=== Science, medicine and engineering ===
- Sir James W. Black, pharmacologist and Nobel laureate
- Sue Black, anatomist and forensic anthropologist
- William Thomas Calman, zoologist
- Richard A. Collins, scientist and author
- Jane Eddleston, medical doctor, professor and critical care expert
- Sir James Alfred Ewing, engineer and physicist
- Margaret Fairlie, gynaecologist and first female professor in Scotland
- Thomas Claxton Fidler, civil engineer
- Angus A. Fulton, civil engineer
- Sir Patrick Geddes, biologist, botanist and urban planning theorist
- Johannes Kuenen, physicist
- Peter LeComber, physicist
- Doris Mackinnon, zoologist
- Narendra Patel, obstetrician, former chancellor of the university
- Alexander David Peacock, zoologist
- William Peddie, mathematician and physicist
- Harold Plenderleith, art conservator and archaeologist
- George Dawson Preston, physicist
- Dorothy MacBride Radwanski, occupational health nurse
- Edward Waymouth Reid, physiologist
- William G. Smith, botanist and ecologist
- Walter Eric Spear, physicist
- John Steggall, mathematician
- Sir William Stewart, government chief scientific advisor
- D'Arcy Wentworth Thompson, biologist, mathematician, and classical scholar
- A. D. Walsh, chemist
- Sir Robert Alexander Watson-Watt, pioneer of radar
- William Alexander Young, doctor, surgeon and epidemiologist
- Isham Jaafar, Minister of Health in Brunei Darussalam

=== Miscellaneous ===
- Colin Norris, serial killer nurse who is believed to have been inspired by lectures at the university in 2001 to kill his patients
- David Shayler, Security Service officer who revealed state secrets to the public, editor of Annasach magazine while at the university
- Cardinal Cornelius Sim, Roman Catholic Bishop of the Apostolic Vicariate of Brunei Darussalam

== See also ==
- Armorial of UK universities
- University of Dundee Botanic Garden – University gardens in the West End of the city.
- List of universities in the United Kingdom
