= Cambridge Stem Cell Institute =

Research centre

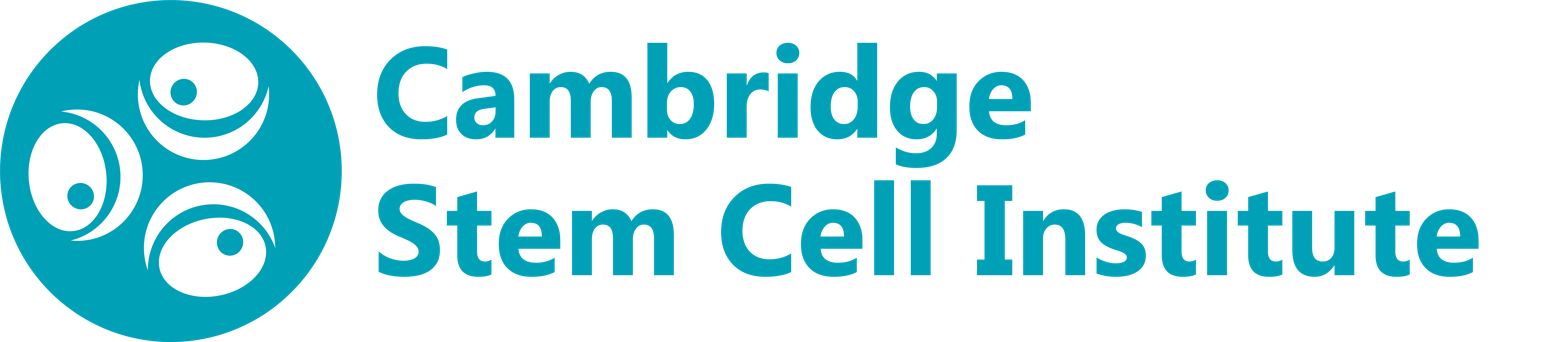
- Established: 2012
- Affiliation: University of Cambridge
- Director: Professor Berthold Göttgens
- Total staff: 400
- Students: 100
- Address: Jeffrey Cheah Biomedical Centre, Puddicombe Way, CB2 0AW, Cambridge, England, United Kingdom
- Website: www.stemcells.cam.ac.uk

The Cambridge Stem Cell Institute (CSCI) at the University of Cambridge is a research centre specializing in the nature and potential medical uses of stem cells. It is located on the Cambridge Biomedical Campus in Cambridge, England and was originally funded by the Wellcome Trust and the Medical Research Council. The Institute is part of the School of Clinical Medicine and the School of Biological Sciences at the university.

In addition to research, the Institute also offers higher education opportunities to train the next generation of clinical and nonclinical stem cell scientists. CSCI's postgraduate program offers: a PhD in Stem Cell Biology, a Master’s degree (MPhil) in Stem Cell Medicine, and a Master’s degree (MPhil) in Biological Science.

== Research ==
Researchers at the Institute study stem cell behaviour to improve the prevention, diagnosis, and treatment of disease. Research is focused around three key themes:

- Stem Cell States – understanding how they develop into different cell types, how they self-renew, and how they maintain their states
- Stem Cells in Disease – investigating the mechanisms responsible for pathological behaviours of stem and progenitor cells, focusing primarily on cancer pathophysiology and regenerative failure.
- Stem Cells & Therapeutics – modelling diseases in vitro to generate new diagnostic and therapeutic potential, researching with clinical trials and new diagnostic tools.

Notable research from CSCI scientists includes:

- The creation of a Human Cell Atlas from Professor Sarah Teichmann, creating a map the ‘molecular fingerprint’ of each cell in order to eventually create a readable map of the body
- The use of gut organoids for detection and treatment of Crohn’s Disease with Professor Matthias Zilbauer
- Research on BRCA1 and BRCA2 gene mutations for breast cancer prevention with Professor Walid Khaled
- Research on cell replacement therapy for Parkinson’s Disease with Professor Roger Barker, currently in human trials in Sweden and the UK
- Extending the ‘shelf life’ of blood stem cells to improve gene therapy with Professor Elisa Laurenti
- Lab-grown blood from Professor Cédric Ghevaert for improved patient transfusions
- Engineered ‘heart patches’ created with stem cells and collagen scaffolding to improve cardiac recovery after tissue damage caused by heart attacks with Professor Sanjay Sinha
- Developing kinder treatments for childhood cancer with Professor Anna Philpott
- Lab-grown mini bile ducts used to repair damaged liver tissues with Dr Fotios Sampaziotis

== History ==
The Institute was founded as a research centre in 2012 created by Professor Roger Pedersen and Professor Austin Smith, who jointly received funding from the Wellcome Trust and Medical Research Council. The centre was composed of researchers across the University of Cambridge working in separate labs and departments, all united in their work with stem cells.

In 2019, the disparate research groups were brought together under one roof in the purpose-built Jeffrey Cheah Biomedical Centre (JCBC), named after entrepreneur and philanthropist Jeffrey Cheah. The JCBC is located on the Cambridge Biomedical Campus, the largest centre of medical research and health science in Europe.

In 2024, CSCI was awarded funding from the Wellcome Trust for a Discovery Research Platform for Tissue Scale Biology.

=== Directorship ===
- 2012–2016 – Professor Austin Smith
- 2016–2021 – Professor Tony Green
- 2021–present – Professor Berthold Gottgens

== Faculty and alumni ==
The Institute has around 30 research groups led by Principal Investigators studying stem cells in fields such as neurobiology, haematology, cardiology, musculoskeletal systems, and more. CSCI also has a network of around 40 affiliated research groups who work closely with researchers at the Institute.

=== Notable CSCI researchers and alumni ===
- Professor Sarah Teichmann
- Professor Benjamin Simons
- Professor Anna Philpott
- Professor David Rowitch (former Group Leader)
- Professor Robin Franklin (former Group Leader)
- Professor Fiona Watt (former Group Leader)
- Professor Austin Smith (former Director and Group Leader)
- Professor Serena Best (Affiliate Group Leader)
- Professor Allan Bradley (Affiliate Group Leader)
- Professor Ruth Cameron (Affiliate Group Leader)
- Professor Anne Ferguson-Smith (Affiliate Group Leader)
- Professor Sarah Franklin (Affiliate Group Leader)
- Professor Richard Gilbertson (Affiliate Group Leader)
- Professor Muzlifah Haniffa (Affiliate Group Leader)
- Dr Mark Kotter (Affiliate Group Leader)
- Professor Madeline Lancaster (Affiliate Group Leader)
- Professor Kathy Niakan (Affiliate Group Leader)
- Professor Azim Surani (Affiliate Group Leader)
