= Bonnie Berger =

American computational biologist

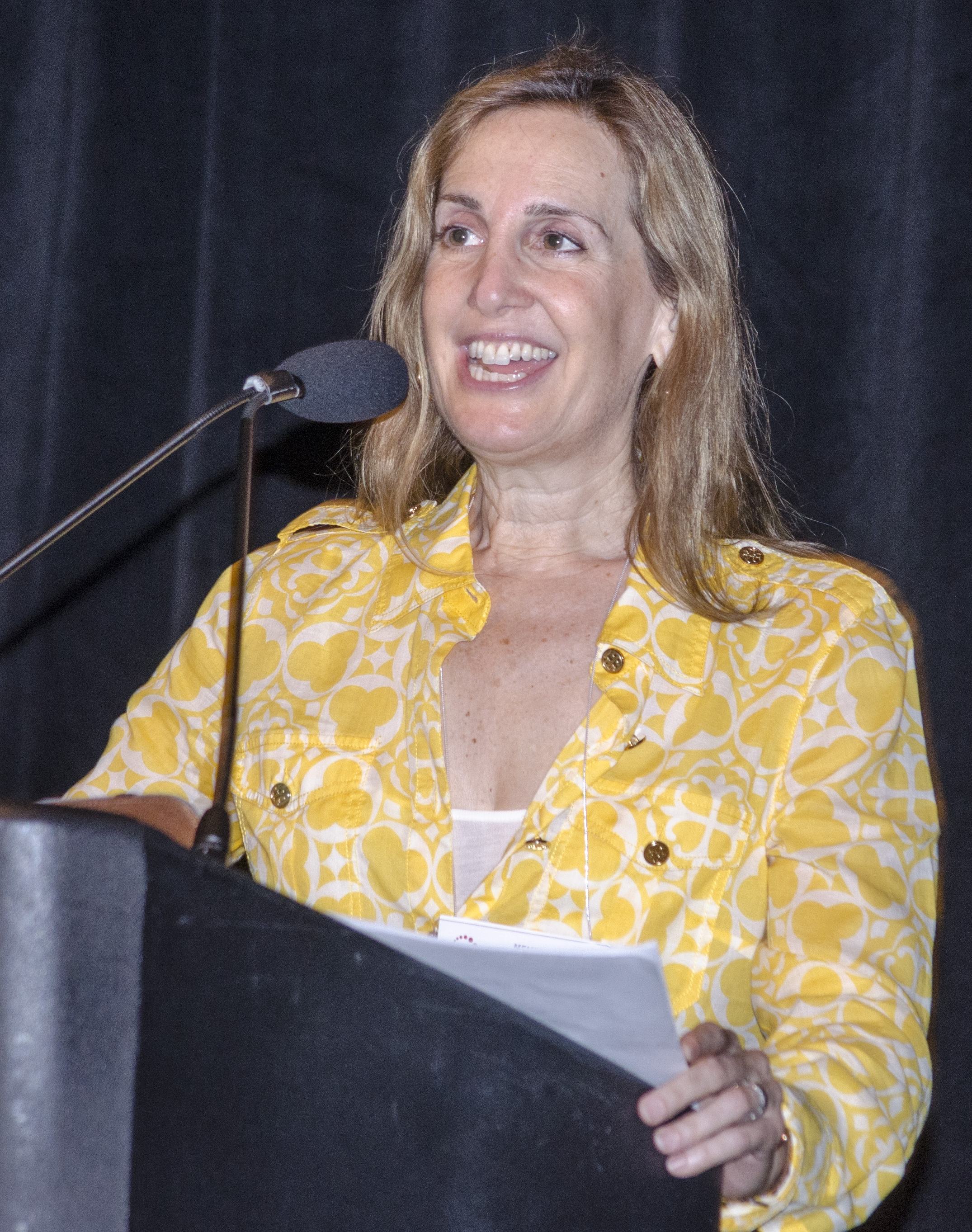
- Born: Bonnie Anne Berger; 1964 or 1965 (age 60–61)
- Education: Brandeis University (BA); Massachusetts Institute of Technology (PhD)
- Spouse: F. Thomson Leighton
- Awards: SIAM Fellow (2022); National Academy of Sciences, Member (2020); AWM-SIAM Sonia Kovalevsky Lecture Award (2020); AMS Fellow (2019); ISCB Senior Scientist Award (2019); AIMBE Fellow (2016); American Academy of Arts and Sciences, Member (2012); ISCB Fellow (2012); ACM Fellow (2003); MIT Technology Review TR100 Award (1999); International Congress of Mathematicians Invited Speaker (1998); Margaret Oakley Dayhoff Award (1997); Machtey Award (1989)
- Scientific career
- Fields: Bioinformatics
- Thesis: Using Randomness to Design Efficient Deterministic Algorithms (1990)
- Doctoral advisor: Silvio Micali
- Doctoral students: Manolis Kellis; Serafim Batzoglou; Lior Pachter; Mona Singh
- Website: people.csail.mit.edu/bab

Bonnie Anne Berger (born 1964 or 1965) is an American applied mathematician and computer scientist, and one of the founding researchers of computational molecular biology. She is the Simons Professor of Mathematics at the Massachusetts Institute of Technology, where she leads the Computation and Biology group at the Computer Science and Artificial Intelligence Laboratory. Her research spans algorithms, bioinformatics, genomics, structural biology, and genomic privacy; landmark contributions include the first comparative human-mouse genome analysis, coiled coil protein structure prediction, and the invention of compressive genomics.

== Biography ==
Berger was born and raised in Miami. Her paternal grandfather was a Jewish immigrant who came to the United States from Russia at the beginning of World War I, and her father was a businessman and classically trained pianist while her mother served as head of the Jewish Education Service of North America. Growing up, she spoke Spanish and studied Hebrew, becoming fluent after spending several months in Israel, and later studied Russian at university. Her father encouraged her interest in mathematics from an early age, and in her first two years of high school she worked through math at her own pace, completing calculus before transferring to a preparatory school where she was one of only two girls taking the subject.

She received a BA from Brandeis University in 1983 and a PhD from MIT in 1990 advised by Silvio Micali. At Brandeis she initially declared majors in Russian and then psychology before discovering an interest in coding through a class on statistical programming in Fortran, after which she switched to the university's new computer science program. As a student at MIT, she was also informally mentored by mathematician Peter Shor. She won the Machtey Award in 1989 for a paper on parallel algorithms that she published with fellow student John Rompel at the Symposium on Foundations of Computer Science.

After completing her PhD, Berger remained at MIT for postdoctoral research. Her postdoctoral advisor Daniel Kleitman, a professor of applied mathematics, introduced her to problems in computational biology after hearing Stanford biophysicist Michael Levitt speak on protein folding, prompting Berger to shift her focus toward biology. She was a fellow at the Radcliffe Bunting Institute in 1992–93. She joined the MIT faculty in 1992 as an assistant professor of applied mathematics, with a joint appointment in the Laboratory for Computer Science. Her research in bioinformatics has been published in leading peer reviewed scientific journals including Science and the Journal of Algorithms. Her former doctoral students include Serafim Batzoglou, Lior Pachter, Mona Singh, Manolis Kellis, and Phil Bradley.

Berger has served as vice president of the International Society for Computational Biology (ISCB) and chair of the steering committee for RECOMB. As ISCB vice president, she ran workshops on gender inequality in 2016 and worked to increase the representation of women and underrepresented minorities among ISCB fellows and awardees. She is an Associate Member of the Broad Institute, a faculty member of Harvard/MIT Health Sciences and Technology, and Affiliated Faculty of Harvard Medical School. She serves on the Executive Editorial Board of the Journal of Computational Biology and on the editorial boards of Annual Review for Biomedical Data Science, Genome Biology, Bioinformatics, IEEE/ACM TCBB, and Cell Systems.

== Research ==
Berger began her research career in algorithms before transitioning to computational molecular biology during her postdoctoral work at MIT. Her postdoctoral advisor Daniel Kleitman, a professor of applied mathematics, encouraged her to apply computational methods to protein folding after hearing Stanford biophysicist Michael Levitt speak on the subject. This pivot marked the beginning of a research program that would span more than a dozen subfields over the following three decades.

=== Protein structure prediction ===
Early in her career, Berger developed methods to predict which proteins would form coiled coil structures, helical bundles in which two or more amino acid chains twist around each other. Drawing on code-breaking techniques that analyze the frequency of character pairs and triplets, she identified sequence-level patterns that distinguish coiled coil proteins from others. The resulting paper and its follow-ups have been cited approximately 2,000 times and enabled downstream work such as predicting how influenza viruses bind to cell membranes. Working with Jonathan King in the MIT biology department and mathematician Peter Shor, she also studied viral capsids, the protein shells that protect viruses and facilitate cell entry. She predicted that capsid formation follows local assembly rules, with each protein subunit acting as a lock-and-key trigger for the next.

=== Comparative and functional genomics ===
In the late 1990s, Berger and her students Serafim Batzoglou and Lior Pachter, working with Broad Institute researcher Eric Lander, developed an algorithm to align the genomes of two different species. In 2000 they published the first paper on comparative genomics, demonstrating that coding regions of the human and mouse genomes are on average 80% identical, a finding that launched the subfield. Berger and Batzoglou also developed the prototype for the Arachne sequence assembler, a software tool later used extensively in assembling the first human genome. She subsequently extended this comparative work to fruit flies (Drosophila) and 18 species of yeast with student Manolis Kellis. With student Rohit Singh, she developed Isorank, software that aligns genome sequences across species using a ranking algorithm analogous to PageRank, integrating heterogeneous data types such as protein-protein interactions and sequence alignments to identify genes with common ancestry and function across species.

=== Compressive genomics ===
Together with students Po-Ru Loh and Michael Baym, Berger invented compressive genomics, a set of methods for compressing DNA sequence, drug molecule, metagenomic, and protein sequence data in such a way that existing analysis software can operate directly on the compressed representation without decompressing it first. The approach exploits the fact that genomic sequences cluster in dense groups of near-identical sequences, allowing each cluster to be summarized by a representative. Her team demonstrated that this technique could accelerate decades-old sequence-comparison algorithms by two orders of magnitude while retaining more than 99% accuracy.

=== Genomic privacy ===
Berger developed a framework for sharing sensitive biological data, such as human genomes, across institutions while preserving privacy, adapting a cryptographic technique called multi-party computation that had not previously been applied at biological scale. Working with students Brian Hie and Hyunghoon Cho, she applied this framework to pharmacological collaboration, allowing competing companies to securely pool data on drug-target interactions without revealing proprietary information to one another. The resulting shared model allows individual companies to query whether a drug targets a protein of interest, enabling more efficient drug repurposing than any single institution could achieve alone.

=== Viral language models ===
More recently, Berger developed a method she calls "Mad Libs for viruses," which repurposes language models trained on protein sequences to predict how readily viral strains will evade the immune system. Unlike earlier methods, it does not require sequence alignments between new strains and known ones. The model's final layer evaluates structural viability, analogous to grammatical correctness, while the penultimate layer assesses semantic divergence from previously seen strains, flagging variants likely to escape existing antibody recognition. Berger applied this approach in collaboration with the Coalition for Epidemic Preparedness Innovations (CEPI) to assess the deltacron SARS-CoV-2 variant and with the Centers for Disease Control and Prevention to predict future variants with immune escape capacity.

== Awards and honours ==
Earlier in her career, Berger received an NSF Career Award and the NIH Margaret Pittman Director's Award. She won the RECOMB Test of Time Award in both 2010 and 2019. Berger was the 1997 winner of the Margaret Oakley Dayhoff Award. In 1998 she was an Invited Speaker of the International Congress of Mathematicians in Berlin (but she was unable to make a personal appearance). In 1999, Berger was included in a list of 100 top innovators published by Technology Review. In 2003, Berger became a Fellow of the Association for Computing Machinery (ACM), and in 2012 she became an elected member of the American Academy of Arts and Sciences and a fellow of the International Society for Computational Biology (ISCB). In 2016, Berger was inducted into the college of fellows of the American Institute for Medical and Biological Engineering (AIMBE). She was included in the 2019 class of fellows of the American Mathematical Society "for contributions to computational biology, bioinformatics, algorithms and for mentoring". She also received an Honorary Doctorate from the École Polytechnique Fédérale de Lausanne (EPFL). She serves as a Member-at-Large of the Section on Mathematics at the American Association for the Advancement of Science (AAAS). She was awarded the ISCB Accomplishment by a Senior Scientist Award in 2019. In 2020 she gave the AWM-SIAM Sonia Kovalevsky Lecture, and was elected to the National Academy of Sciences. She was elected as a Fellow of the Society for Industrial and Applied Mathematics in the 2022 Class of SIAM Fellows, "for pioneering work in computational molecular biology, including comparative and compressive genomics, network inference, genomic privacy, and protein structure prediction".

== Personal life ==
Berger is married to MIT professor and CEO of Akamai Technologies F. Thomson Leighton. She has described reducing her publication output during a period in the middle of her career while raising her children, and said she returned to full productivity around 2009.
