= Biotechcellence =

Indian technical symposium

- Genre: technical symposium
- Begins: 9 March 2017
- Ends: 11 March 2017
- Locations: Anna University, Chennai, India
- Founded: 1996
- Organiser: Student Organisation
- Filing status: Student Run Non Profit Organisation
- Sponsor: Centre for Biotechnology, Anna University
- Website: www.biotechcellence2017.com

Biotechcellence is a national level technical symposium that was established by the co-operative efforts of Department of Biotechnology (DBT) and Association of Bio-technologists of Anna University in India. The symposium aims to highlight advancements in biotechnology that have taken place over the years in the medical, industrial, and agricultural fields.

== Centre for Biotechnology ==
The Centre for Biotechnology (CBT) was established in 1987 at the Anna University - supported by the Department of Biotechnology, Delhi and the University Grants Commission, Delhi. Its objectives were:

- To provide educational and training facilities in different areas of Biotechnology
- To carry out fundamental research in the frontier areas of Biotechnology
- To promote research and consultancy activities in the development of various areas of Biotechnology

The Centre for Biotechnology was one of the first departments to offer Industrial Biotechnology (IBT) as a professional course, and later began courses in Pharmaceutical Technology and Food Technology as added specializations.

== History ==
Biotechcellence was started in the year 1994 by the Association of Biotechnologists, Anna University. Biotechcellence has hosted many notable people of both scientific and industrial backgrounds including James Watson, Jules Hoffmann, and Dr. Madhan Babu, Cambridge University.

== Biotechcellence 2017 ==
Biotechcellence 2017, the 23rd edition of Biotechcellence, was hosted from March 9-11, 2017 at Anna University. It consists of the symposium, events and workshops.

The following events were held as a part of Biotechcellence 2017:

- Oral Presentation
- Poster Presentation
- Bacteriography
- Pick Your Brains
- Cerebrus
- 5+ Online Events

The workshops a part of Biotechcellence 2017 were:

- Stem Cell Technology
- Food Adulteration Analysis
- Bio-Informatics
