= Francis Crick Medal and Lecture =

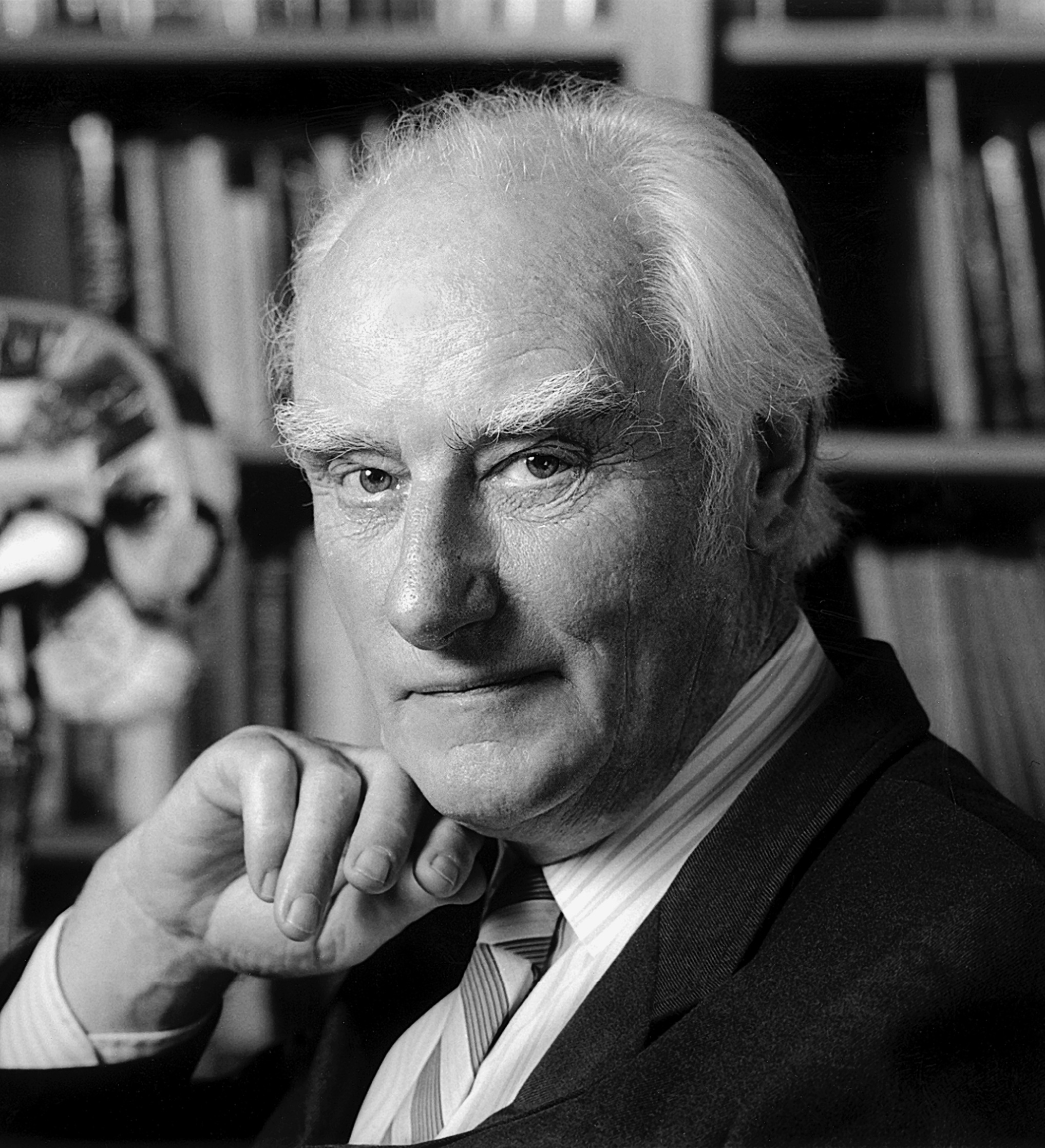
- Francis Crick 1916-2004
- Awarded for: Prize lecture given on a subject in genetics, molecular biology and neurobiology
- Sponsored by: Sydney Brenner; Royal Society
- Date: 2003
- Rewards: Bronze Medal and gift of £2,000
- Website: royalsociety.org/awards/francis-crick-lecture

The Francis Crick Medal and Lecture is a prize lecture of the Royal Society established in 2003 with an endowment from Sydney Brenner, the late Francis Crick's close friend and former colleague. It is delivered annually in biology, particularly the areas which Francis Crick worked (genetics, molecular biology and neurobiology), and also to theoretical work. The medal is also intended for young scientists, i.e. under 40, or at career stage corresponding to being under 40 should their career have been interrupted.

== List of lectures ==
Laureates include:

- 2026 Thi Hoang Duong (Kelly) Nguyen for ground-breaking discoveries into the molecular mechanisms of telomere maintenance.
- 2025 Kayla C. King for contributions to the fields of evolutionary biology and genetics of infectious disease
- 2024 Sam Behjati for fundamental discoveries into the developmental roots of childhood cancer
- 2023 Stephen Fleming for tackling foundational questions about the neurobiology of conscious experience and advancing our understanding of the neural and computational basis of metacognition
- 2022 Tiago Branco for making fundamental advances in the molecular, cellular and circuit bases of neuronal computation and for successfully linking these to animal decision behaviour
- 2021 Serena Nik-Zainal for enormous contributions to understanding the aetiology of cancers by her analyses of mutation signatures in cancer genomes, which is now being applied to cancer therapy
- 2020 Marta Zlatic for discovering how neural circuits generate behaviour by developing and disseminating definitive techniques, and by discovering fundamental principles governing circuit development and function
- 2019 Gregory Jefferis for his fundamental discoveries concerning the development and functional logic of sensory information processing
- 2018 Miratul Muqit in recognition of his research on cell signalling linked to neurodegeneration in Parkinson’s disease
- 2017 Simon Myers for transforming our understanding of meiotic recombination and of human population history.
- 2016 Madan Babu Mohan for his major and widespread contributions to computational biology
- 2015 Rob Klose for his research on how chromatin-based and epigenetic processes contribute to gene regulation
- 2014 Duncan Odom for his pioneering work in the field of comparative functional genomics
- 2013 Matthew Hurles on Mutations: great and small
- 2012 Sarah Teichmann on Finding patterns in genes and proteins: decoding the logic of molecular interactions
- 2011 Simon Boulton on Repairing the code
- 2010 Gilean McVean on 'Our genomes, our history
- 2009 Jason Chin on Reprogramming the code of life
- 2008 Simon Fisher on A molecular window into speech and language
- 2007 Geraint Rees on Decoding consciousness
- 2006 Dario Alessi on Deciphering disease
- 2005 Daniel Wolpert on The puppet master: how the brain controls the body
- 2004 Julie Ahringer on Genes, worms and the new genetics
- 2003 Ewan Birney on Being human: what our genome tells us

== See also ==
- List of genetics awards
