= Duncan Odom =

American research group leader

Duncan T. Odom
- Born: Duncan Odom
- Education: New College of Florida (BA); California Institute of Technology (PhD)
- Awards: Crick Lecture (2014); EMBO Member (2015); Mary Lyon Award (2016)
- Scientific career
- Fields: Evolution; Genomics; Bioinformatics; Transition metal chemistry; Gene expression
- Workplaces: DKFZ German Cancer Research Center; Heidelberg University; University of Cambridge; Cancer Research UK; Wellcome Trust Sanger Institute; Whitehead Institute
- Thesis: The application of metallointercalators in recognition of and charge transport in nucleic acids (2001)
- Doctoral advisor: Jacqueline Barton
- Other academic advisors: Richard A. Young
- Doctoral students: Christina Ernst
- Website: www.dkfz.de/en/regulatorische-genomik

Duncan T. Odom is a research division head at the German Cancer Research Center (DKFZ) in Heidelberg, and a university professor at Heidelberg University. Previously he was a research group leader at the Cancer Research UK Cambridge Institute (CRUK CI) at the University of Cambridge (2006-2022) and an associate faculty member at the Wellcome Trust Sanger Institute (2011-2018).

== Education ==
Odom was educated at the New College of Florida where he was awarded a Bachelor of Arts degree in Chemistry in 1995. He continued his study at California Institute of Technology (Caltech) where he was awarded a PhD in chemistry for research on DNA-binding metallo-intercalators supervised by Jacqueline Barton.

== Career and research ==
After a period as a postdoctoral researcher in genetics and genomics at the Whitehead Institute in Cambridge, Massachusetts with Richard A. Young, he established his research group at the University of Cambridge in 2006. His research investigates how transcription and transcriptional regulation vary during evolution, and its implications for diseases such as cancer, using high throughput biology methods to investigate genome evolution. As of 2017, according to Google Scholar his most highly-cited papers have been published in Cell, Chemical Reviews, and Science.

His research has been funded by the National Institute of Diabetes and Digestive and Kidney Diseases, the Alfred P. Sloan Foundation, the European Research Council (ERC), the European Molecular Biology Organization (EMBO), the Wellcome Trust and Cancer Research UK. His former doctoral students include Christina Ernst.

=== Awards and honours ===
Odom was awarded the Crick Lecture by the Royal Society in 2014 for his "pioneering work in the field of comparative functional genomics, which has changed our understanding of the evolution of mammalian transcriptional regulation." He was awarded EMBO Membership in 2015, and the Mary F. Lyon Medal from The Genetics Society in 2016.
