= Albert Cardona =

Neuroscientist

== Proposed deletion of ARTICLE_NAME ==
The article ARTICLE_NAME has been proposed for deletion because of the following concern:

Does not meet Wikipedia:Notability (people).

You may prevent the proposed deletion by removing the {{proposed deletion/dated}} notice, but please explain why in your edit summary or on the article's talk page.

Please consider improving the page to address the issues raised. Removing {{proposed deletion/dated}} will stop the proposed deletion process, but other deletion processes exist. In particular, articles for deletion allows discussion to reach consensus for deletion based on established criteria.

If the proposed deletion has already been carried out, you may request undeletion of the article at any time.

Albert Cardona
- Spouse: Marta Zlatic
- Scientific career
- Fields: Neuroscience; Connectomics
- Workplaces: MRC Laboratory of Molecular Biology; University of Cambridge
- Website: Personal website Lab website

Albert Cardona is a neuroscientist and connectomics researcher who is a Programme Leader at the MRC Laboratory of Molecular Biology. and a Professor at the University of Cambridge in Cambridge, UK. He is also a Fellow at Pembroke College, Cambridge. His research maps neuronal circuits with synaptic resolution using volume electron microscopy, particularly in small animals such as the Drosophila, and studies how the structure of a neural circuit relates to its function

== Education and career ==
Cardona completed his PhD at the University of Barcelona (2000–2005), where he studied developmental biology. He then undertook postdoctoral research on Drosophila neuroanatomy at UCLA (2005–2008).

Between 2008 and 2011, Cardona was a Group Leader at the Institute of Neuroinformatics, jointly run by the University of Zurich and ETH Zurich. During this period, he developed computational and image-processing methods for neural circuit reconstruction and co-founded two influential open-source platforms that have become widely adopted in the neuroscience community.

Cardona joined the Howard Hughes Medical Institute (HHMI) Janelia Research Campus in 2012, serving as Group Leader until 2019. In 2019, he was appointed Programme Leader at the MRC Laboratory of Molecular Biology and Professor at the University of Cambridge, where he leads research on whole-brain connectomics, circuit development, and structure–function relationships in neural systems.

== Research contributions ==
=== Open-source software development ===
Cardona co-founded FIJI (Fiji Is Just ImageJ), an open-source platform for biological image analysis that has been adopted by thousands of research laboratories worldwide. The platform extends ImageJ with features specifically designed for analyzing large biological datasets.

He also co-founded CATMAID (Collaborative Annotation Toolkit for Massive Amounts of Image Data), a web-based platform that enables distributed teams of researchers to collaboratively reconstruct neural circuits from electron microscopy data.

=== Insect brain connectome ===
Cardona is a co-senior author of the first complete synaptic-resolution connectome of an insect brain, published in Science in 2023. This work mapped approximately 3,000 neurons and 548,000 synapses in the Drosophila larva brain, representing a significant milestone in connectomics. The reconstruction involved an international collaboration spanning multiple years and required the development of new computational methods for handling and analyzing the large-scale electron microscopy datasets.

Cardona's laboratory has used these connectome datasets to investigate the neural basis of learning, sensory processing, and motor control in Drosophila, combining anatomical reconstructions with functional studies to understand how circuit structure relates to behavior.
