= Muzlifah Haniffa =

Malaysian dermatologist and immunologist

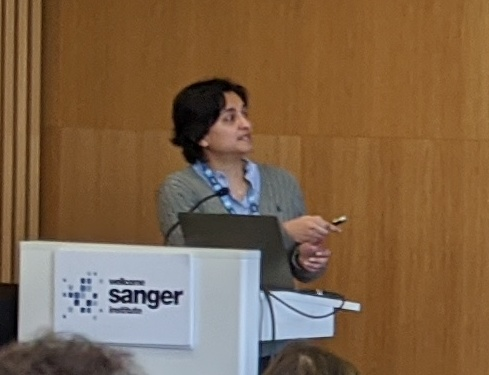
- Presenting at the Wellcome Trust Sanger Institute in 2020
- Born: Penang, Malaysia
- Education: Newcastle University
- Scientific career
- Fields: Dermatology, Immunology, Bioinformatics

Muzlifah Haniffa is a Malaysian dermatologist and immunologist who focuses on the development of the immune system and the use of single-cell techniques to understand biology. Haniffa is Deputy Institute Director of the Wellcome Sanger Institute, where she also heads the Cellular Genomics programme and is a Senior Group Leader. Haniffa is a Professor of Dermatology and Immunology at Newcastle University, a Wellcome Senior Research Fellow in Clinical Science, a Senior Research Fellow at Churchill College, University of Cambridge, and a Fellow of the CIFAR MacMillan Multiscale Human Programme.

== Early life and education ==
Haniffa was born in Penang, Malaysia. Her interests in science as a child were piqued initially by space, but later she decided to pursue a career as a clinical scientist. Haniffa studied at Tunku Kurshiah College, Seremban and moved to the UK in the 1990s. Haniffa graduated BSc, MBBCh from the University of Wales College of Medicine in 1999. She became a member of the Royal College of Physicians in 2002. In 2007, she earned a diploma in epidemiology from the London School of Hygiene & Tropical Medicine. She completed her PhD from Newcastle University in 2009 and completed her clinical dermatology training in 2010. She was runner-up for the 2009 Sue McCarthy Prize from the Medical Research Council.

== Career ==
In 2013 the European Society for Dermatology Research awarded Haniffa a Silver Award for her research. She was shortlisted for the 2016 North Eastern Woman Entrepreneur of the Year awards in the STEM category. In 2016 her research into the functions of white blood cells was boosted by a £200,000 fellowship by the Lister Institute of Preventive Medicine. Professor Chris Day, serving as vice-chancellor of the medical faculty, congratulated Haniffa on her achievement, saying:

Professor Haniffa is one of the outstanding clinician scientists of her generation and has rapidly, in her short career, established an international reputation in her field

— Chris Day

Haniffa's work on the immune system has included discovering that a population of what was considered dendritic cells (defined by the presence of CD14) in human skin were in fact macrophages, and studies demonstrating that a subset of dendritic cells exist in mice which can activate T helper 17 cells against a fungal infection. Haniffa was awarded the 2018 Early Career Prize in Allerlology by the 5th European Congress on Immunology. She is a committee member of the British Society for Investigative Dermatology, who had awarded Haniffa a Junior Investigator Prize in 2012.

Haniffa was a founding member of the Human Cell Atlas, which aims to characterise all cells in the human body using single-cell transcriptomic techniques, alongside Sarah Teichmann, Fiona Powrie, Ashley Moffett, and others, and in this organisation is co-Vice-Chair and Development Biological Network Coordinator.

In 2018 her lab contributed to the discovery of the major subset of kidney cells which become mutated and give rise to kidney cancers. This was accomplished by matching the biological make-up of kidney carcinoma cells to given healthy kidney cells. This was followed by a single-cell study of the placenta which discovered new cell sub-types in the decidua, informing understanding of how the maternal and fetal immune systems interact with each other and avoid miscarriage or pre-eclampsia. The study used 70,000 cells and tissue from the Human Developmental Biology Resource. In addition Haniffa and collaborators have published single-cell studies on the innate and adaptive immune system, including regulatory T cells, dendritic cells, and monocytes. In 2019 the Chan Zuckerberg Initiative announced that it was investing $68 million in grants into furthering the Human Cell Atlas, including awards for Haniffa to study the immune system and liver during ageing in single-cell detail.

== Awards ==
In 2019, Haniffa was awarded the Foulkes Foundation Academy of Medical Sciences Medal which is awarded biennially to a rising star making a significant impact on UK bioscience research. Haniffa was elected a Fellow of the Academy of Medical Sciences in 2020, and elected a Member of EMBO in 2023. In 2024, Haniffa was awarded the European Journal of Immunology Ita Askonas Award which recognises female group leaders in immunology who have run an independent laboratory for under ten years. In 2025, Haniffa was awarded the British Society for Developmental Biology's Cheryll Tickle Medal that celebrates outstanding contributions by mid-career female scientists. In 2026 Haniffa was awarded the Human Genome Organisation Chen Award of Excellence for significant early career contributions to genomics.
