= Austin Gerard Smith =

British stem cell biologist (born 1960)

Austin Smith
- Born: Austin Gerard Smith; 1960 (age 65–66); Merseyside, UK
- Education: University of Edinburgh
- Awards: Louis-Jeantet Prize for Medicine (2010)
- Scientific career
- Fields: Stem Cells
- Workplaces: University of Exeter
- Thesis: (1986)
- Doctoral advisor: Martin Hooper
- Website: www.exeter.ac.uk

Austin Gerard Smith (born 1960) is a professor at the University of Exeter and director of its Living Systems Institute. He is notable for his pioneering work on the biology of embryonic stem cells.

== Education ==
Austin Smith obtained his doctoral degree from the University of Edinburgh in 1986.

== Career and research ==
He then carried out postdoctoral research at the University of Oxford, before joining the Centre for Genome Research at the University of Edinburgh as a group leader. In 1996, he was appointed director of the centre, which became the Institute for Stem Cell Research under his leadership. He remained as director of the Institute until his move to Cambridge in 2006. Here, he became a director of the Welcome Trust Centre for Stem Cell Research and later was the director of the new Wellcome Trust-MRC Cambridge Stem Cell Institute at the University of Cambridge, which was established with 8 million pounds ($12.5 million) awarded by the Wellcome Trust and Medical Research Council (UK) in 2012.

In 2019, he was appointed as the new Director of the University of Exeter's Living Systems Institute.

In 2003, Smith was awarded an MRC Research Professorship and elected to the Royal Society of Edinburgh. And in 2006, was elected a Fellow of the Royal Society. In 2010, he was co-recipient of the Louis-Jeantet Prize for Medicine along with French cardiologist Michel Haissaguerre.

In February 2010, together with 13 other leading stem cell researchers, he wrote an open letter to journal editors to voice the opinion that obstructive reviews by a small number of researchers in the field were hindering publication of novel stem cell research.
