= Serena Nik-Zainal =

British-Malaysian clinician

- Born: England
- Education: University of Cambridge
- Awards: Crick Lecture (2021)
- Scientific career
- Fields: Genomics
- Workplaces: University of Cambridge; Wellcome Sanger Institute
- Thesis: Exploring mutational signatures in twenty-one breast cancers (2013)
- Website: www.sanger.ac.uk/person/nik-zainal-serena/

Serena Nik-Zainal is a British-Malaysian clinician who is a consultant in clinical genetics and Cancer Research UK advanced clinician scientist at the University of Cambridge. She makes use of genomics for clinical applications. She was awarded the Crick Lecture by the Royal Society in 2021. Serena Nik-Zainal was also recognized as one of the 100 Influential Women in Oncology by OncoDaily.

== Early life and education ==
Nik-Zainal was born in England. Her father was a cardiologist who was involved in the first coronary artery bypass surgery to take place in Malaysia. She was supported by Petronas to attend the University of Cambridge, where she studied medicine. She moved to the Wellcome Sanger Institute in 2009, where she started doctoral research using whole genome sequencing to better understand breast cancer. Whole genome sequencing allows for Nik-Zainal to understand the frequency, distribution and mutation patterns of cancer. She showed that it was possible to identify mutational signatures using downstream analysis, and that algorithms could be used to identify abnormalities quickly. These signatures are left by mutations that occur during the development of cancer. During her research she identified the hypermutation kataegis.

== Research and career ==
Nik-Zainal was awarded a Wellcome Trust Clinical Fellowship in 2013. She moved to the Wellcome Sanger Institute, where she explored whole genome sequencing of tumours. Her research combined computational processes and cell-based model systems.

In 2017 Nik-Zainal moved to the University of Cambridge, supported by a Cancer Research UK Advanced Clinician Scientist fellowship. Her research group investigate the physiology of mutagenic activity. She has studied both driver and passenger mutations. Passenger mutations can be used to understand how DNA is damaged and repaired during tumorigenesis. Nik-Zainal looks to identify mutational signatures in human cancers and the aetiologies that give rise to them. Nik-Zainal leads the clinical research project Insignia, which researches mutational signatures in people with neurodegeneration, ageing syndromes and DNA repair defects. Nik-Zainal has continued to develop computational approaches to identify DNA damage in tumours, insight into which can help to determine the most effective treatment in cancer patients.

As of 2024, she has an h-index of 70.

=== Awards and honours ===
Nik-Zainal was the first woman to win the Josef Steiner Cancer Research Award, in 2019. In 2021 she was awarded a Research Professorship at the National Institute for Health Research (NIHR) and the Foulkes Foundation Academy of Medical Sciences Medal, which recognises rising stars in UK bioscience research. In 2022, she was awarded the Francis Crick Medal and Lecture by the Royal Society for her work on the aetiology of cancer and contributions to cancer therapies. She was elected a Fellow of the Academy of Medical Sciences in 2023, and was awarded the European Society for Medical Oncology Award for Translational Research in 2024.

=== Selected publications ===
Her publications

- Signatures of mutational processes in human cancer
- Landscape of somatic mutations in 560 breast cancer whole-genome sequences
- Massive genomic rearrangement acquired in a single catastrophic event during cancer development

== Personal life ==
Nik-Zainal has two children.
