= Stacey Gabriel =

American geneticist

- Education: Carnegie Mellon University; Case Western Reserve University
- Spouse: Robert Munsey
- Scientific career
- Fields: Genomics
- Institutions: Broad Institute
- Academic advisors: Aravinda Chakravarti

Stacey B. Gabriel is an American geneticist and Senior Director of the Genomics Platform at the Broad Institute. With Eric Lander, she is also the co-director of the National Human Genome Research Institute's sequencing center at the Broad Institute. She was named the "hottest researcher" on Thomson Reuters' list of the World's Most Influential Scientific Minds in 2014. She was given this honor because she published twenty-three of the most cited papers of 2013, more than any other single researcher recorded by Thomson Reuters. Out of the twenty-three articles she published that year, her favorite paper was examining various tumors and then exploring and analyzing which genes were involved in causing cancer. She topped the same list again in 2015. She is also an ISI Highly Cited Researcher.

In 2020, Gabriel helped create and organize a high-throughput COVID-19 testing facility based out of the Broad Institute. Under her guidance, the institute has processed over 10 million tests as of April 2021.

== Education ==
Gabriel received her B.S. in molecular biology from Carnegie Mellon University in Pittsburgh, and a Ph.D. in human genetics from Case Western Reserve University in Cleveland, Ohio.

== Life and work ==
Much of Gabriel’s research interests explore new uses of genomic techniques to identify the genetic basis of common diseases and gain a better understanding of them. After joining the nonprofit Whitehead Institute/MIT Center for Genome Research in 1998, her research has provided a foundation for the International HapMap Project as well as many large national projects. She has also been an active member of the steering committee for international research supporting the 1000 Genomes Project (abbreviated as 1KGP). As an expert in the field of genomics, Gabriel has contributed in several genetics and genomics projects and is the Principal Investigator of the Broad Institute All of Us (abbreviated as AoU) Genomics Center.

== Selected publications ==
- Writing Group Members; Roger, Véronique L.; Go, Alan S.; Lloyd-Jones, Donald M.; Benjamin, Emelia J.; Berry, Jarett D.; Borden, William B.; Bravata, Dawn M.; Dai, Shifan; Ford, Earl S.; Fox, Caroline S. (2012). "Heart Disease and Stroke Statistics—2012 Update: A Report From the American Heart Association". Circulation. 125 (1): e2–e220. doi:10.1161/CIR.0b013e31823ac046. ISSN 0009-7322. PMC 4440543. PMID 22179539.
- McKenna, Aaron; Hanna, Matthew; Banks, Eric; Sivachenko, Andrey; Cibulskis, Kristian; Kernytsky, Andrew; Garimella, Kiran; Altshuler, David; Gabriel, Stacey; Daly, Mark; DePristo, Mark A. (2010). "The Genome Analysis Toolkit: A MapReduce framework for analyzing next-generation DNA sequencing data". Genome Research. 20 (9): 1297–1303. doi:10.1101/gr.107524.110. ISSN 1088-9051. PMC 2928508. PMID 20644199.
- Gabriel, Stacey B.; Schaffner, Stephen F.; Nguyen, Huy; Moore, Jamie M.; Roy, Jessica; Blumenstiel, Brendan; Higgins, John; DeFelice, Matthew; Lochner, Amy; Faggart, Maura; Liu-Cordero, Shau Neen (2002-06-21). "The Structure of Haplotype Blocks in the Human Genome". Science. 296 (5576): 2225–2229. Bibcode:2002Sci...296.2225G. doi:10.1126/science.1069424. PMID 12029063. S2CID 10069634.
- Gabriel, Stacey; Ziaugra, Liuda; Tabbaa, Diana (2009). "SNP Genotyping Using the Sequenom MassARRAY iPLEX Platform". Current Protocols in Human Genetics. 60 (1): 2.12.1–2.12.18. doi:10.1002/0471142905.hg0212s60. ISSN 1934-8258. PMID 19170031. S2CID 39898987.
- McGuire, Amy L.; Gabriel, Stacey; Tishkoff, Sarah A.; Wonkam, Ambroise; Chakravarti, Aravinda; Furlong, Eileen E. M.; Treutlein, Barbara; Meissner, Alexander; Chang, Howard Y.; López-Bigas, Núria; Segal, Eran (2020). "The road ahead in genetics and genomics". Nature Reviews Genetics. 21 (10): 581–596. doi:10.1038/s41576-020-0272-6. ISSN 1471-0056. PMC 7444682. PMID 32839576.
