= Serafim Batzoglou =

Greek researcher

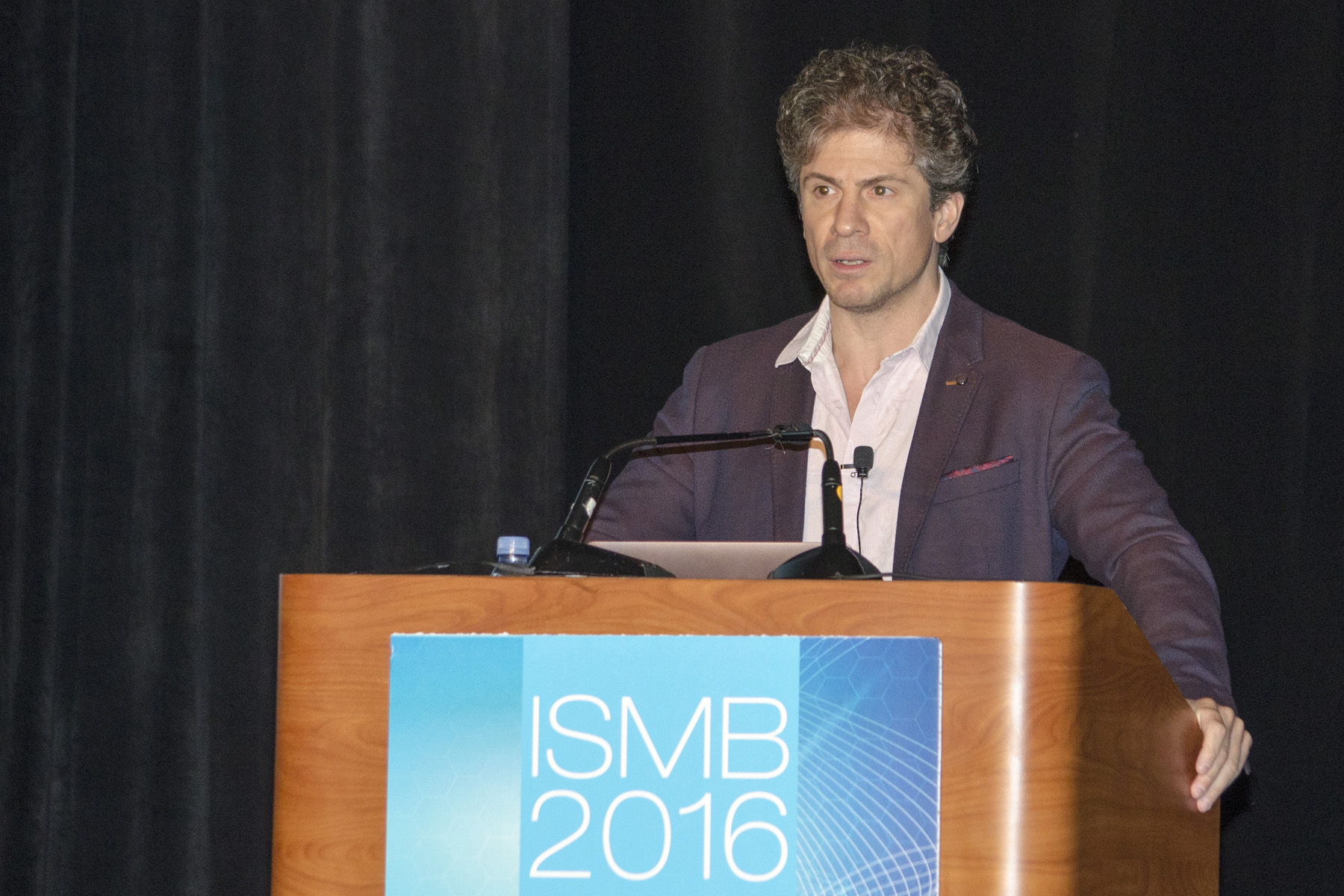
- Born: Athens, Greece
- Education: MIT
- Scientific career
- Thesis: (2000)
- Doctoral advisor: Bonnie Berger

Serafim Batzoglou is a Greek-American researcher in the field of computational genomics, and the Chief Data Officer at Seer, Inc.

Prior to that he was Chief Data Officer at insitro, co-founded DNAnexus, and was VP of computational genomics at Illumina, Inc., and professor of computer science at Stanford University between 2001 and 2016 working alongside Daphne Koller (founder and CEO of insitro) in Stanford University’s computer science department.

His research lab focused on computational genomics with special interest in developing algorithms, machine learning methods, and systems for the analysis of large scale genomic data. He has also been involved with the Human Genome Project and ENCODE.

== Background ==
Batzoglou did his undergraduate studies at MIT and his PhD in computer science from MIT in 2000 under the supervision of Bonnie Berger.

== Awards ==
- ISCB Fellow (2020)
- ISCB Innovator Award (2016)
- Sloan Research Fellowship, Alfred P. Sloan Foundation
- Career Award in Computer Science, National Science Foundation
- Top 100 Young Technology Innovators, MIT Technology Review
- Best Paper Award, ISMB (2003)
