= Paul Blainey =

American geneticist

- Education: University of Washington (BS); Harvard University (MS, PhD)
- Scientific career
- Fields: Genomics
- Workplaces: Broad Institute; MIT

Paul Blainey is an investigator and core faculty member at the Broad Institute in Boston, Massachusetts, and assistant professor of biological engineering at the Massachusetts Institute of Technology (MIT). He is recognized for his work in single cell genomics.

Blainey studied mathematics and chemistry as an undergraduate at the University of Washington. He continued his studies in physical chemistry at Harvard University, earning a M.S. and Ph.D. He did a postdoc at Stanford University, where he developed high-throughput methods for whole-genome amplification of DNA from individual microbial cells in Stephen Quake’s laboratory.

== Awards ==
- Burroughs Wellcome Fund Career Awards at the Scientific Interface, 2011
- Agilent Early Career Investigator Award, 2014
- 2017 NIH New Innovator Award
