= Anna Philpott =

British biologist and Professor

Anna Philpott FMedSci
- Education: M.A in Natural Sciences, University of Cambridge, PhD in Zoology, University of Cambridge
- Awards: Anne McLaren Award for Outstanding Women in Developmental Biology (2018), Pilkington Teaching Prize (2019), EMBO Membership (2020), Fellow of the Academy of Medical Sciences (2022)
- Scientific career
- Fields: Natural Sciences Developmental Biology Cancer
- Workplaces: Professor of Cancer and Developmental Biology, University of Cambridge
- Thesis: Nuclear Decondensation in Xenopus Egg Extracts
- Doctoral advisor: Professor Ron Laskey
- Website: https://www.stemcells.cam.ac.uk/people/pi/philpott

Anna Philpott is an English biologist and academic. From August 2019 to September 2024, she served as Head of the School of Biological Sciences at the University of Cambridge and from October 2024, she has been appointed as the Cambridge University Pro-Vice-Chancellor for Resources and Operations. She is also a professor of Cancer and Developmental Biology and Principal Investigator at the Wellcome-MRC Cambridge Stem Cells Institute. Philpott is a Fellow of Clare College.

She is married to Ben Simons, also a professor at the University of Cambridge, and has two children, Elena (born 2002) and Samuel (born 2004).

== Education ==
Anna Philpott graduated from the University of Cambridge (Selwyn College) with an M.A in Natural Sciences in 1988 and went on to do a PhD in the Zoology Department and Wellcome/CRC Institute of Cancer and Developmental Biology (now the Gurdon Institute) at the University of Cambridge, with Professor Ron Laskey, finishing in 1991.

== Scientific career ==
Between 1992 and 1997, she undertook post-doctoral fellowships in Boston, USA at the Massachusetts General Hospital Cancer Centre with Professor Stephen Friend and in the Department of Cell Biology, Harvard Medical School with Professor Marc Kirschner. She returned to the University of Cambridge in 1998 to start her own lab in the Department of Oncology.

Philpott was appointed University Lecturer in the Department of Oncology at the University of Cambridge in January 1998 after her return from the US. She was promoted to University Reader in 2008 and to Professor in Cancer and Developmental Biology in October 2015. Between August 2015 and July 2019, she also served as Deputy Head of the Department of Oncology.

Philpott joined the Wellcome-MRC Cambridge Stem Cell Institute as a Principal Investigator in March 2016, was Head of the School of the Biological Sciences between August 2019 and September 2024 and appointed Pro-Vice-Chancellor for Resources and Operations in October 2024.

== Research ==
Philpott is a developmental biologist with an interest in how cells in developing embryos control the decision to divide or differentiate, as well as how this co-ordination is disrupted in cancers.

Philpott's research looks at the balance between cell proliferation and differentiation during normal development, in adult tissue and in cancer. Her work also investigates the control of proneural factors, a class of proteins that regulate cell behaviours by turning genes on and off, and has studied their roles in the nervous system, the pancreas and the gut. She has identified cyclin-dependent kinase-dependent phosphorylation of proneural transcription factors as a critical fulcrum that co-ordinates cell cycle exit and differentiation in multiple tissues. This control is subverted in cancers, in particular the paediatric tumour neuroblastoma, and offers a potential new approach to treating this disease. The ultimate goal of Philpott's research is to expand understanding of normal and dysregulated cell biology and use this knowledge to point the way to new therapeutic interventions for cancer and regenerative medicine.

Philpott's research uses a range of model systems including stem cells and Xenopus frog embryos, a versatile model used to investigate biological mechanisms and processes across a wide range of biological scales

Philpott's research has been funded by the Medical Research Council, Biotechnology and Biosciences Research Council, Wellcome Trust, Cancer Research UK, British Heart Foundation, the Rosetrees Trust and Neuroblastoma UK.

She is author or co-author of over 100 scientific articles.

== Awards and honours ==
In 2018, Philpott received The Anne McLaren Award for Outstanding Women in Developmental Biology from the International Society of Differentiation. She has also been awarded the 2019 Pilkington Prize for Teaching, recognising her work in conceiving, designing and implementing an MRes/PhD Programme in Cancer Biology and Medicine. The award also recognised her efforts in championing diversity and mentoring younger female trainees.

In 2020, Philpott was elected member of the European Molecular Biology Organization (EMBO), recognising her contribution to research in the life sciences. EMBO Members actively participate in EMBO initiatives, including mentoring young scientists, or supporting activities such as the promotion of science policy.

Philpott was elected Fellow of the Academy of Medical Sciences in May 2022. The 2022 Fellows were recognised for contributions to biomedical and health science and generation of knowledge to improve health worldwide.
