= Disease Cell Atlas =

Single-cell and spatial trancriptomics technologies are disruptive technologies by revealing previously hidden cellular states within tissues, organs, and disease. Disease Cell Atlases (DCAs) extend these capabilities by systematically mapping the full spectrum of cell types, cell states, and molecular programs involved in a given pathology. Several recent example of disease cell atlas have been recently performed including in human lung, the kidney tissue atlas, and the spatial myocardial infarction atlas, just to cite a few. These atlases integrate single-cell transcriptomics, spatial data, and clinical metadata to elucidate disease mechanisms, identify biomarkers, and guide therapeutic development. This complements efforts from the Human Cell Atlas with focus on mapping cellular states across organs in homeostasis conditions. Challenges related to the creation of disease cell atlas include high costs, sample availability and their complex computational analysis.

== Computational challenges ==
The challenges in the computational analysis of disease cell atlas are multifactorial. A first aspect in to align and perform batch correction of samples, which might have originatated from distinct cohorts with distinct isoluation and single cell technology measurements. Standard pipelines such as Seurat and Scanpy provides frameworks for bach correction. However, care needs to be taken on the tradeoff of batch correctio and removal of biological signals as review by Luecken and colleagues. After batch correction and cell annotation, additional analysis include compositional analysis, i.e. veryfing cellular changes across samples and conditions. This will reveal if a particular novel or cell type specific cell population is arising.

A more recent approach is to perform sample level analysis. One approach is to pseudo-bulk sample and or cell level single cell libraries. This loses however the information on the variability of the cells. Optimal transport theory, which allow to find similarities between distribution of cells, represents a powerful alternative to pseudo-bulk. This has been explored in PheEMD in the context of cellular perturbation experiments. Later, PILOT explored OT in the context of single cell disease atlas to not only to delineate sub-cluster of patients but also to find trajectories associated with disease progression.
