= Human Cell Atlas =

Global health science project

Content
- Description: The Human Cell Atlas is a global consortium that is creating detailed maps of the cells in the human body to transform understanding of health and disease.
- Organisms: Human

Contact
- Primary citation: Regev, Aviv; et al. (Human Cell Atlas Organizing Committee) (2018). "The Human Cell Atlas White Paper". arXiv:1810.05192 [q-bio.TO].

Access
- Website: www.humancellatlas.org

The Human Cell Atlas is a global project to describe all cell types in the human body, to understand human health and for diagnosing, monitoring, and treating disease.

The global scientific consortium has a network of more than 3,600 members in 102 countries. The project is making data and resources publicly available, and aims to create an open, ethical and representative atlas to benefit humanity.

As of 2024, the project has mapped approximately 62 million human cells into 18 Biological Networks, which includes cells from vital systems such as the nervous system, lungs, heart, intestine and immune system.

== Background and description ==
The Human Cell Atlas (HCA) consortium was founded in 2016 with the aim of building a biological Atlas of every cell in the human body. The initiative was announced by a consortium after its inaugural meeting in London in October 2016, which established the first phase of the project. Aviv Regev and Sarah Teichmann defined the goals of the project at that meeting, which was convened by the Broad Institute, the Wellcome Trust Sanger Institute and Wellcome Trust. Regev and Teichmann led the project for the first 10 years, with Muzlifah Haniffa and Alexandra-Chloe Villani leading the HCA from October 2026.

The international consortium released a White Paper in 2017 detailing its plans. The Human Cell Atlas aims to define all human cell types by systematically cataloguing cells based on their type, state, location and lineage using advanced single-cell genomics techniques and computational analysis.

Its scope is to categorize the 37 trillion cells of the human body to determine which genes each cell expresses by sampling cells from all parts of the body. This goal has been compared in its ambition to the Human Genome Project, which cataloged the first full human DNA sequence.

The HCA consortium is committed to creating an open, ethical, equitable and representative atlas for humanity that represents and benefits people everywhere. By 2024 it had grown into a global network of more than 3,600 scientists in 102 countries. All aspects of the project will be made "available to the public for free", including software and results. HCA data are freely accessible worldwide through the HCA Data Portal.

The first draft of the Human Cell Atlas is being assembled by researchers in 18 'HCA Biological Networks' mapping individual tissues and organs, including the heart, lung, liver, and immune system. Draft atlases from the HCA Lung, Nervous System, Organoid and Eye Biological Networks have been assembled by HCA researchers collaborating globally with other consortia. In November 2024 the consortium released a collection of studies that are described in the journal Nature as representing 'a significant step towards assembling a first draft atlas'.

== Consortium and organisation ==
The Human Cell Atlas is a global collaborative consortium. It is steered and governed by an Organising Committee of 35 international scientists with diverse areas of expertise, led by Sarah Teichmann and Aviv Regev. A smaller HCA Executive Committees advises on routine tasks. HCA Executive Offices, based across the UK, USA, Japan and Singapore support and coordinate the consortium.

HCA Working Groups for Analysis, Ethics, Equity, Standards and Technology, and Data Ecosystem oversight, harmonize methods and approaches across the consortium.

Regular consortia-wide meetings and local workshops are organised in different locations to enable discussion and collaboration. Regional Networks in Africa, Asia, Latin America and the Middle East, initiated and led by researchers in these areas, help to coordinate efforts to enable the atlas to serve all parts of the world.

Atlasing is organised into 18 HCA Biological Networks, dedicated to mapping and analysing different individual tissues, organs and systems, eg Skin, Gut and Reproduction. Led by experts in their respective biological fields, each Biological Network collaborates with a central computational integration team to achieve an integrated atlas.

== Funding ==
As the Human Cell Atlas is a grass roots-led, global and open scientific project, researchers contributing data and methods to the HCA seek their own funding for their research. Support for their work comes from a variety of sources worldwide, for example studies in the 2024 Nature Collection of papers were supported by more than one hundred different funding sources.

In addition, a mix of philanthropic and public funders have initiated HCA funding programmes, focused on specific tissues, data access, methods and representation. These included the Chan Zuckerberg Initiative, the Wellcome Trust, the Helmsley Charitable Trust, the Medical Research Council, the European Union commission, and the British Heart Foundation. The HCA has also received organisational support from the Chan Zuckerberg Initiative, Wellcome, the Klarman Family Foundation, and the Helmsley Charitable Trust, among others.

Some of the first funding to be announced was from the Chan Zuckerberg Initiative (CZI). In October 2017, the Chan Zuckerberg Initiative announced funding for 38 projects related to the Human Cell Atlas. Among this early funding was a grant to the Zuckerman Institute of the Columbia University Medical Center at Columbia University. The grant, titled "A strategy for mapping the human spinal cord with single cell resolution", will fund research to identify and catalogue gene activity in all spinal cord cells. The Translational Genomics Research Institute received a grant to develop a standard for the "processing and storage of solid tissues for single-cell RNA sequencing", compared to the typical practice of relying on the average of sequencing multiple cells. Project home pages are available at the Chan Zuckerberg Initiative's website.

== Data and scientific output ==
The Human Cell Atlas Consortium is building detailed maps of the human body, using cutting-edge single cell and spatial genomics methods at massive scale, combined with powerful computing and AI methods.

Human Cell Atlas data are freely accessible worldwide through the HCA Data Portal. By November 2024 approximately 62 million cells from around 9,100 donors had been mapped and added to the HCA Data Portal. The first HCA V1 integrated Atlas of a tissue was created in 2023 from the human lung , followed so far by HCA V1 Atlases from the HCA Nervous System, Organoid, Eye and Breast Biological Networks, assembled by HCA researchers collaborating globally with other consortia. Roadmap papers describe how other HCA Biological Networks are assembling Atlases of their specific tissue, organ or system, including human development, oral and craniofacial tissues, skin, gut, musculoskeletal system, liver, and adipose tissue.

Journal publications that are part of the Human Cell Atlas community are listed on the publications page of their website, with 444 publications by November 2024. Open access pre-print publications are available from the Human Cell Atlas bioRxiv channel.

Key publications from the Human Cell Atlas community include four studies that were published together in 2022, mapping cell types across human tissues. These included immune cells, cells from frozen tissue and Tabula Sapiens data that was published on a dedicated website.

The consortium released a collection of more than 45 studies in 2024. These included publications on mapping specific organs and development, computational tools for data analysis and integration, and ethics and equity.

== Commercial Agreements to Empower Science ==
The Human Cell Atlas has negotiated discounts for scientists to purchase reagents and sequencing products used in biomedical research from a select number of biotechnology companies, including 10x Genomics, BioLegend, and Oxford Nanopore Technologies.

== See also ==
- List of distinct cell types in the adult human body
- ENCODE – Encyclopedia of DNA Elements (ENCODE)
- Human Genome Project
- Human Protein Atlas
- Human Biomolecular Atlas Program
- Disease Cell Atlas
