= Marta Zlatic =

Neuroscientist

Marta Zlatic FRS
- Born: 24 February 1977 (age 49); Zagreb, Croatia
- Education: University of Cambridge (BA, PhD)
- Spouse: Albert Cardona
- Awards: Crick Lecture (2020); EMBO Member (2020)
- Scientific career
- Fields: Neuroscience; Neural development
- Workplaces: MRC Laboratory of Molecular Biology; Janelia Research Campus
- Thesis: Establishment of connectivity in the embryonic central nervous system of Drosophila. (2004)
- Website: www2.mrc-lmb.cam.ac.uk/group-leaders/t-to-z/marta-zlatic/

Marta Zlatic FRS (born 24 February 1977) is a Croatian neuroscientist who is group leader at the MRC Laboratory of Molecular Biology in Cambridge, UK. Her research investigates how neural circuits generate behaviour.

== Early life and education ==
Zlatic is from Zagreb, Croatia. She has said that growing up she had excellent Latin and Greek teachers. She was awarded a full scholarship to study the Natural Sciences Tripos at Trinity College, Cambridge. During her summer holidays from Cambridge, Zlatic studied linguistics and Russian at the University of Zagreb. Alongside her studies, Zlatic was involved with the Cambridge theatre scene, taking part in Greek tragedies and Shakespeare's plays. As an undergraduate student Zlatic attended the lectures of Mike Bate, where he discussed the neural circuits of fruit flies. She enjoyed the lectures so much that she applied for a postgraduate degree. During her doctoral research Zlatic looked at the development of neurons in Drosophila. As the nervous system starts to form, neurons start to produce axons and dendrites. Zlatic showed that sensory neurons, which allow for sight, sound, pain and touch, look for particular locations in the nervous system using positional cues.

== Research and career ==
After earning her doctorate, Zlatic was awarded a postdoctoral fellowship at the University of Cambridge which allowed her to travel internationally and study the assembly of neural circuits. In 2009 Zlatic started her independent career at the Janelia Research Campus. At Janelia she learnt about the genetic tools used to manipulate the types of neurons in Drosophila. Zlatic has dedicated her career to the study of the nervous system, in particular the positional cue known as the slit protein which controls how sensory neuron axons start and stop growing. She showed that slit proteins control branching along the mediolateral axis but not the dorsoventral axis, indicating that there are positional cues in three-dimensions.

Zlatic is interested the complex functions of the human brain, including language and communication. She studies these phenomena in the Drosophila larva (maggot). She made use of electron microscopy to map the entire larval Drosophila connectome, and studies the strengths of the connections between neurons that are structurally connected. By investigating the connectivity of these neurons it is hoped that these particular patterns could be associated with the formation of memories.

=== Awards and honours ===
- 2025: Elected Fellow of the Royal Society
- 2024: Elected Fellow of the Academy of Medical Sciences
- 2020: Elected to EMBO Membership by the European Molecular Biology Organization (EMBO).
- 2020: Awarded the Crick Lecture by the Royal Society
- 2017 Eric Kandel Young Neuroscientist Prize
- 2004 Thomas Henry Huxley Award from the Zoological Society of London

=== Publications ===
Her publications include:

- Labeling of active neural circuits in vivo with designed calcium integrators
- A multilevel multimodal circuit enhances action selection in Drosophila
- The complete connectome of a learning and memory centre in an insect brain

== Personal life ==
Zlatic is fluent in several languages, including Croatian, English, German, French, Russian, Spanish, Italian, Ancient Greek, and Latin. Alongside her enthusiasm for languages and neuroscience, Zlatic is an actress. She is married to neuroscientist Albert Cardona.
