= ISCB Innovator Award =

Scientific award

- Awarded for: "leading scientists who are within two decades post-degree, who consistently make outstanding contributions to the field, and who continue to forge new directions"
- Sponsored by: International Society for Computational Biology (ISCB)
- First award: 2016
- Website: www.iscb.org/iscb-awards/iscb-innovator-award

The ISCB Innovator Award is a computational biology prize awarded annually to leading scientists who are within two decades post-degree, who consistently make outstanding contributions to the field, and who continue to forge new directions. The prize was established by the International Society for Computational Biology (ISCB) in 2016 and is awarded at the Intelligent Systems for Molecular Biology (ISMB) conference. The inaugural recipient was Serafim Batzoglou.

== Laureates ==
- 2026 Olga Troyanskaya
- 2025 Fabian Theis
- 2024 Su-In Lee
- 2023 Dana Pe'er
- 2022 Núria López Bigas
- 2021 - Benjamin J. Raphael
- 2020 - Xiaole Shirley Liu
- 2019 - William Stafford Noble
- 2018 - M. Madan Babu
- 2017 - Aviv Regev
- 2016 - Serafim Batzoglou

== Other ISCB prizes ==
- Overton Prize - "for outstanding accomplishment to a scientist in the early to mid stage of his or her career"
- ISCB Senior Scientist Award - "members of the computational biology community who are more than 12 to 15 years post-degree and have made major contributions to the field of computational biology through research, education, service, or a combination of the three"

== See also ==
- List of biology awards
