= Bang Wong =

Creative director at MIT and Harvard

Bang Wong is the creative director of the Broad Institute at MIT and Harvard University. He is considered "one of the leading innovators at the interface of art and medicine" by Nature Medicine, and is a National Academy of Sciences Kavli Fellow and board member of the Association of Medical Illustrators. He holds a master of science in immunology and a master of arts in medical and biological illustration from the Johns Hopkins School of Medicine, where he also serves as an adjunct assistant professor. In 2010, he launched a monthly column in Nature Methods about the visual presentation of scientific data which ran until 2013.
