= Journal of Computational Biology =

Monthly scientific journal established 1994

- Discipline: Computational biology
- Language: English
- Edited by: Mona Singh

Publication details
- History: Since 1994
- Publisher: Mary Ann Liebert
- Frequency: Monthly
- Open access: Hybrid
- Impact factor: 1.6 (2024)

Standard abbreviations
- ISO 4: J. Comput. Biol.

Indexing
- CODEN: JCOBEM
- ISSN: 1066-5277 (print); 1557-8666 (web)
- LCCN: 94658564
- OCLC no.: 26981925

Links
- Journal homepage; Online archive

The Journal of Computational Biology is a monthly peer-reviewed scientific journal covering computational biology and bioinformatics. It was established in 1994 and is published by Mary Ann Liebert, a subsidiary of Sage Publishing. The founding editors-in-chief were Sorin Istrail (Brown University) and Michael S. Waterman (University of Southern California), who served until 2020 when they were succeeded by Mona Singh (Princeton University). The journal publishes occasional special issues, often based on the proceedings of scientific meetings.

== Abstracting and indexing ==
The journal is abstracted and indexed in:

- Biological Abstracts
- BIOSIS Previews
- Chemical Abstracts Service
- Current Contents/Life Sciences
- EBSCO Databases
- Index Medicus/MEDLINE/PubMed
- MathSciNet
- Science Citation Index Expanded
- Scopus

According to the Journal Citation Reports, the journal has a 2024 impact factor of 1.6.

== See also ==
- BMC Bioinformatics
- IEEE Transactions on Computational Biology and Bioinformatics
- PLOS Computational Biology
