= Mona Singh (scientist) =

American computational biologist

- Education: Harvard University (BA); Massachusetts Institute of Technology (PhD)
- Awards: ACM Fellow (2019); ISCB Fellow (2018); PECASE (2001)
- Scientific career
- Fields: Genomics; Bioinformatics; Computational biology
- Institutions: Princeton University
- Thesis: Learning algorithms with applications to robot navigation and protein folding (1996)
- Doctoral advisor: Ron Rivest; Bonnie Berger
- Website: www.cs.princeton.edu/~mona/

Mona Singh is an American computer scientist and researcher in the field of computational molecular biology and bioinformatics. She is the Wang Family Professor in Computer Science in the Lewis-Sigler Institute for Integrative Genomics and the Department of Computer Science at Princeton University. Since 2021, she has been the Editor-in-Chief of the Journal of Computational Biology.

== Education ==
Singh was educated at Indian Springs School, Harvard University, and the Massachusetts Institute of Technology (MIT), where she was awarded a PhD in 1996 for research supervised by Ron Rivest and Bonnie Berger.

== Career and research ==
Singh's research interests are in computational biology, genomics, bioinformatics and their interfaces with machine learning and algorithms.

== Awards and honors ==
Singh was awarded a Presidential Early Career Award for Scientists and Engineers (PECASE) from the National Science Foundation (NSF) in 2001. She was elected a Fellow of the International Society for Computational Biology (ISCB) in 2018 for "outstanding contributions to the fields of computational biology and bioinformatics". She was elected an ACM Fellow in 2019 "for contributions to computational biology, spearheading algorithmic and machine learning approaches for characterizing proteins and their interactions".
