= DNA-binding metallo-intercalators =

Biomolecules capable of binding to DNA by unwinding the Double Helix

DNA-binding metallo-intercalators are positively charged, planar, polycyclic, aromatic compounds that unwind the DNA double helix and insert themselves between DNA base pairs. Metallo-intercalators insert themselves between two intact base pairs without expelling or replacing the original nitrogenous bases; the hydrogen bonds between the nitrogenous bases at the site of intercalation remain unbroken. In addition to π-stacking between the aromatic regions of the intercalator and the nitrogenous bases of DNA, intercalation is stabilized by van der Waals, hydrophobic, electrostatic, and entropic interactions. This ability to bind to specific DNA base pairs allows for potential therapeutic applications of metallo-intercalators.

== Synthesis of metallo-intercalators ==
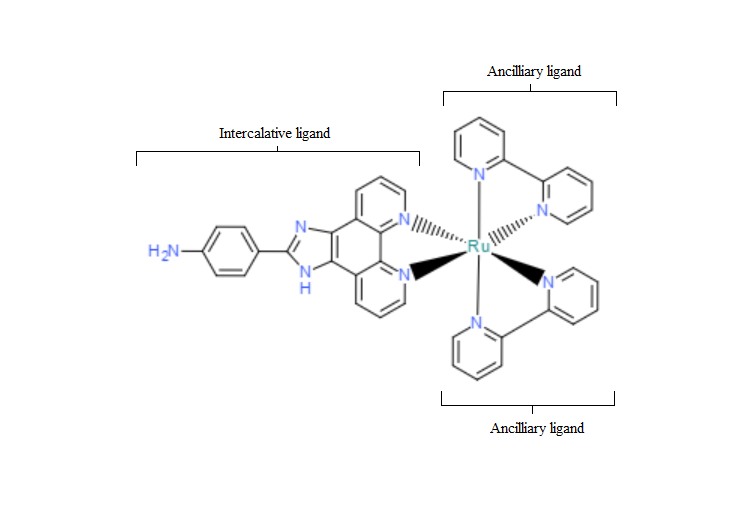
Figure 1: Chemical structure of the DNA-binding metallo-intercalator complex [Ru(bpy)2(paip)]2+ with intercalative and ancillary ligands labeled.

In the case of ruthenium intercalators, the general synthesis consists of preparing intercalative ligands followed by their coupling to a ruthenium metal complex coordinated by specific ancillary ligands. Examples of prior ruthenium complexes used as precursors for metallo-intercalators include cis-[Ru(bpy)_{2}Cl_{2}] and cis-[Ru(phen)_{2}Cl_{2}]∙2H_{2}O, which can be synthesized into [Ru(bpy)_{2}(maip)]^{2+}, [Ru(bpy)_{2}(paip)]^{2+}, [Ru(bpy)_{2}(bfipH)](ClO_{4})_{2}, and Ru(phen)_{2}(bfipH)](ClO_{4})_{2}.

== Mechanism of DNA-intercalation ==
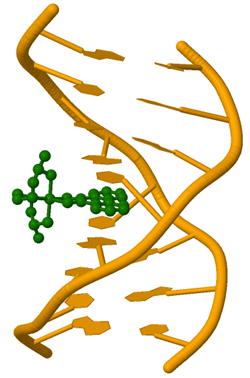
Figure 2: Metallo-intercalators enter double stranded DNA via the major groove and π-stack between adjacent unbroken base pairs. Here, the phi ligand of a rhodium complex intercalates a DNA segment with the sequence 5'-G(5IU)TGCAAC-3' (PDB ID 454D).

Metallo-intercalators π-stack with unbroken DNA base pairs after entering via a groove, typically the major, (in contrast to metallo-insertors, which replace expelled base pairs after entering double stranded DNA via the minor groove). Intercalation of a metallo-intercalator creates less strain in the DNA duplex than insertion; metallo-insertors induce an untwist of the double helix and an opening of the phosphate backbone while metallo-intercalators marginally increase the rise and width of the major groove. Intercalation of metal compounds between DNA base pairs effectively stabilizes the double helix, increasing the melting temperature of the DNA duplex. Binding of metallo-intercalators to DNA is reversible and depends on the properties of the intercalating molecule. Metallo-intercalators with different metal centers, oxidation states, coordination geometries, and overall sizes will exhibit varying “depths of insertion”. For example, square planar complexes penetrate deeper into the DNA base pairs than octahedral or tetrahedral complexes do. Also, positive charges on the metallo-intercalator strengthen DNA-binding because of electrostatic attraction to the negatively charged sugar-phosphate backbone.

== Therapeutic applications ==
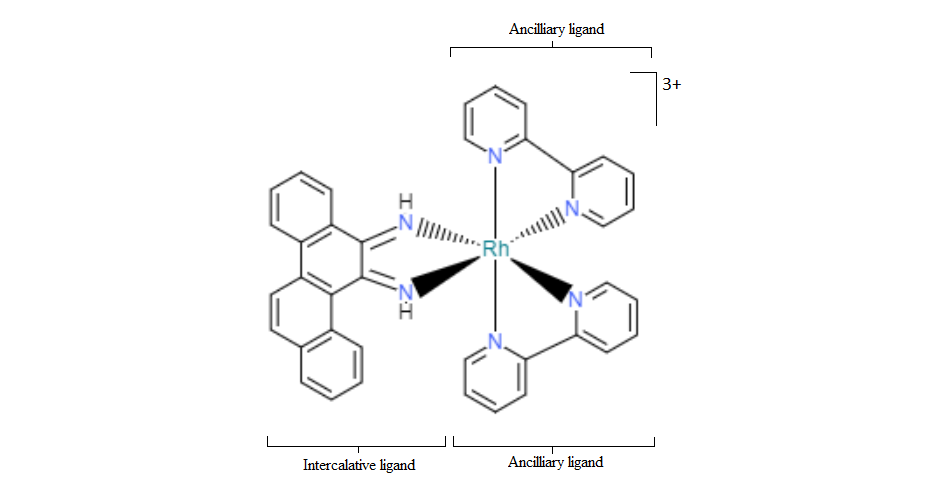
Figure 3: The wide structure of metallo-intercalators containing the ligand 5,6-chrysenequinone diimine (chrysi) can be used in anticancer therapeutics to identify mismatched DNA base pairs.

Metallo-intercalators have a variety of potential therapeutic applications as a result of their structural diversity and universal photooxidative properties. One possible therapeutic application of metallo-intercalators is to combat cancerous tumor cells within the body by targeting specific mismatched DNA base pairs; the ability to modify the ligands bound to the metal center allows for a high degree of specificity in the binding interactions between the metallo-intercalator and the DNA sequence. For example, the ligand 5,6-chrysenequinone diimine (chrysi) and its analogues are designed to be too wide to fit inside the normal span of the base pairs of B-DNA, causing it to bind instead to the wider portions of the helix at destabilized sites of mismatched bases. After intercalation, the sample can be photoactivated by absorbing energy during irradiation with short wavelength light. This activation causes the metallo-intercalator's photooxidative properties to induce a cleavage of the sugar phosphate backbone at the site of mismatch through a radical mechanism. Even in the absence of irradiation, the interactions between the metallo-intercalator and DNA can substantially decrease the proliferation of cells containing DNA with mismatched base pairs.
