= M. Madan Babu =

Indian-American computational biologist

M. Madan Babu FRS FRSC FMedSci
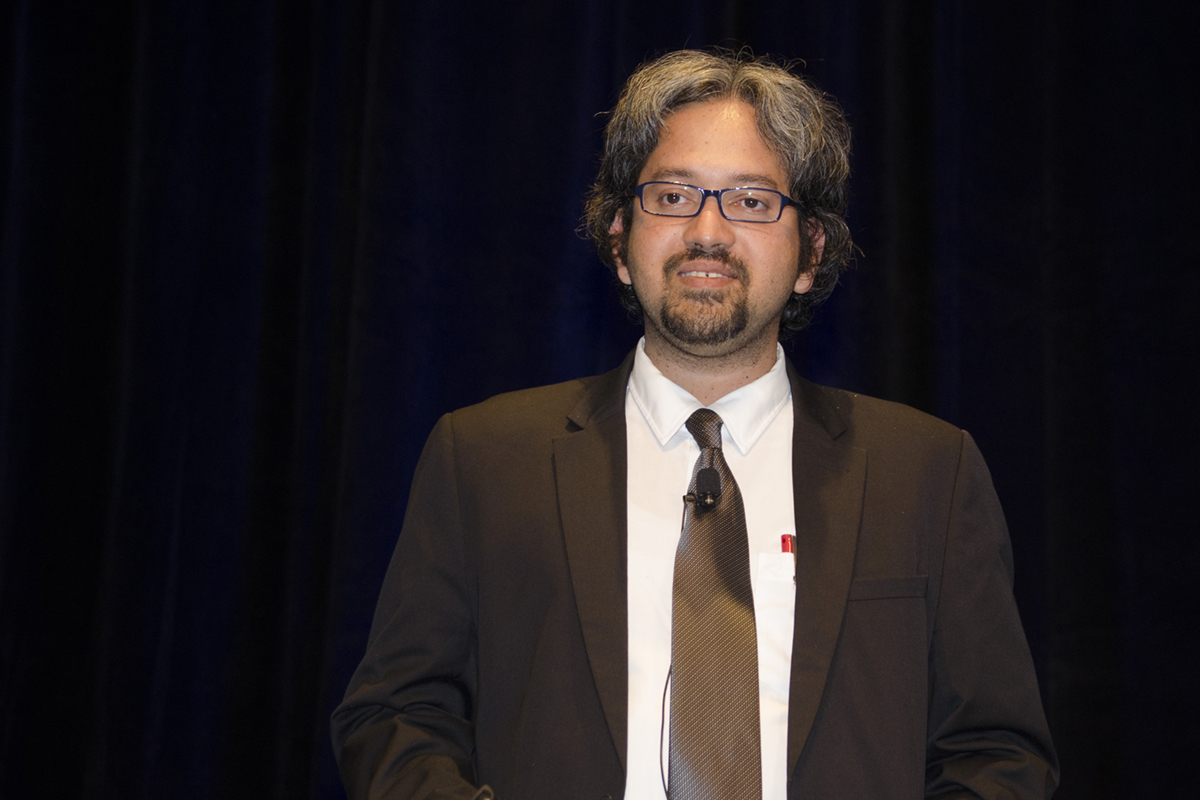
- M. Madan Babu speaking at the Intelligent Systems for Molecular Biology (ISMB) conference in Chicago in 2018
- Born: Mohan Madan Babu
- Education: Anna University (BTech); University of Cambridge (PhD)
- Awards: Colworth Medal (2014); Crick Lecture (2016); EMBO Member (2016); Blavatnik Awards for Young Scientists (2018); ISCB Innovator Award (2018); EMBO Gold Medal (2019)
- Scientific career
- Fields: Computational biology Systems biology Network biology Disordered proteins Regulatory genomics
- Workplaces: St. Jude Children's Research Hospital; MRC Laboratory of Molecular Biology; University of Cambridge; National Center for Biotechnology Information
- Thesis: Evolution of transcriptional regulatory networks (2004)
- Doctoral advisor: Sarah Teichmann
- Website: www.stjude.org/directory/b/madan-babu.html

M. Madan Babu FRS FRSC FMedSci is an Indian-American computational biologist and bioinformatician. He is the endowed chair in biological data science and director of the center of excellence for data-driven discovery at St. Jude Children's Research Hospital. Previously, he served as a programme leader at the MRC Laboratory of Molecular Biology (LMB).

== Early life and education ==
Babu grew up in Chennai, India. He became interested in learning to program as a young child when his father brought home a personal computer. Babu was introduced to biotechnology as a high school student. He obtained his Bachelor of Technology degree from Anna University, where he was introduced to the field of computational biology. Babu obtained his PhD in computational genomics at the University of Cambridge supervised by Sarah Teichmann in 2004.

== Career and research ==
After his PhD, Babu was a postdoctoral researcher at the National Center for Biotechnology Information (NCBI), at the National Institute of Health (NIH) in Bethesda, Maryland with Aravind L. Iyer. In 2006, he became a group leader at the MRC Laboratory of Molecular Biology in Cambridge, UK. In July 2020, Babu joined the faculty of St. Jude Children's Research Hospital as the endowed chair in biological data science in the structural biology department and director of the center of excellence for data-driven discovery.

Babu's research focuses on understanding the regulation of cellular systems at varying scales, including molecular, system, and genomic levels. He also studies the effects of such regulation on genome evolution. In particular, his research group studies G protein-coupled receptors and intrinsically disordered proteins using a combination of computational biology and experimental biology approaches.

As of 2020 Babu serves as chief editor of the journal Molecular Systems Biology.

=== Awards and honours ===
- 2009: EMBO young investigator, European Molecular Biology Organization (EMBO)
- 2010: Won the Early Career Research Award from the Biochemical Society
- 2011: Awarded the Balfour Lecture by the Genetics Society
- 2011: Won the Royal Society of Chemistry Molecular BioSystems Award
- 2014: Awarded the Colworth Medal by the Biochemical Society
- 2014: Awarded the research prize by the Lister Institute of Preventive Medicine
- 2014: Won the Protein Society Protein Science Young Investigator Award
- 2015: Awarded the Francis Crick Lecture by the Royal Society
- 2016: Elected a member of the European Molecular Biology Organization
- 2017: Elected a Fellow of the Royal Society of Chemistry (FRSC)
- 2018: Won the Blavatnik Award for Young Scientists from the New York Academy of Sciences
- 2018: Won the ISCB Innovator Award from the International Society for Computational Biology (ISCB)
- 2019: Won the EMBO Gold Medal
- 2021: Elected a Fellow of the Academy of Medical Sciences
- 2023: Elected a Fellow of the Royal Society
