= Miratul Muqit =

British neurologist

- Born: 1973 (age 52–53); Glasgow, Scotland
- Education: University of Edinburgh, Harvard University, University College London
- Occupations: Consultant Neurologist, Professor
- Organization: University of Dundee
- Known for: Contributions to the study of PINK1 in Parkinson’s disease
- Website: https://www.ppu.mrc.ac.uk/research/principal-investigator/miratul-muqit

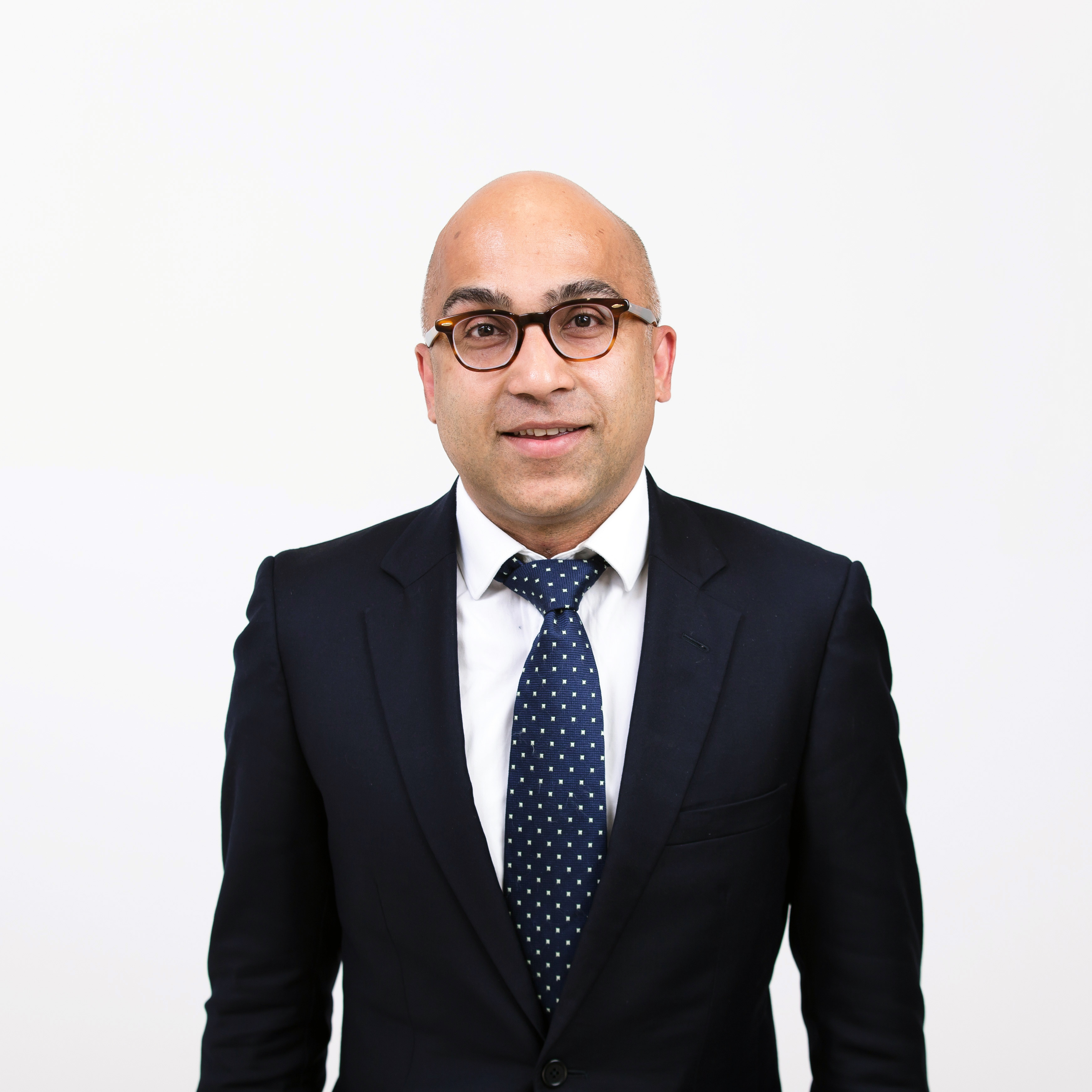
Muqit in 2023 at Academy of Medical Sciences in London

Miratul Muqit FRSE FMedSci is a British neurologist and a Programme Lead at the MRC Protein Phosphorylation and Ubiquitylation Unit (MRCPPU) in the School of Life Sciences at the University of Dundee. His research focuses on the study of the PINK1 gene, mutations in which are a major cause of Parkinson's disease.

== Education and career ==
Muqit studied medicine at the University of Edinburgh and graduated with Honours in 1997. During his studies, he became interested in neurodegenerative diseases, and in 2000 he was awarded a Kennedy scholarship at Harvard University which he completed within a year of study. His interest in neurodegeneration led him to study for a PhD in University College London’s Institute of Neurology, awarded to him in 2007.

He also received clinical training in medicine and neurology at the Hammersmith Hospital and the National Hospital for Neurology and Neurosurgery in London.

He joined the MRC PPU at the University of Dundee in 2008 and has worked there since combining laboratory research and clinical work as a Consultant Neurologist specialising in Movement Disorders. He was appointed Professor of Experimental Neurology in October 2018.

== Research ==
Muqit's research focuses on the protein PINK1, study of which he began during his PhD in UCL. He is credited as a major contributor to the discovery of PINK1 mutations as a cause of Parkinson's disease, and he has been working on it ever since.

PINK1 is a kinase which normally senses damaged mitochondria and targets them for destruction, and mutations which interrupt its function will induce Parkinson's disease. Much of his research focuses on characterising PINK1 to understand its signalling pathway and the effects of it and its mutations on the cell, in order to help find treatments for Parkinson's Disease.

His research team at the university of Dundee has already discovered substrates of PINK1 such as Parkin and Ubiquitin, which have helped to clarify the function of this kinase. They have also made an effort to understand the mechanisms of activation and regulation of PINK1.

== Impact ==
Muqit's research on Parkinson's and other neurological diseases has been cited by the larger scientific community over 10000 times

Muqit is a member of the scientific advisory board of Mitokinin Inc. He was formerly on the scientific advisory board of Amgen Inc.

His work was also covered widely on media including TV news, Scotland Tonight, where he was asked for his professional take on the subject.

== Awards ==
- Queen Square Prize in Neurology (2006)
- Wellcome Trust Intermediate Clinical Fellowship (2008)
- Wellcome Trust Senior Fellowship in Clinical Science (2013)
- Linacre Prize Lecture from the Royal College of Physicians (2013)
- Fellow of the Royal College of Physicians (2016)
- European Molecular Biology Organisation(EMBO) Young Investigator Programme (2016)
- Graham Bull Prize in Clinical Science & Goulstonian Lecture of the Royal College of Physicians (RCP) (2018)
- Royal Society Francis Crick Medal and Lecture (2018)
- Brian Cox Prize in public engagement (2019)
- Fellow of the Royal Society of Edinburgh (2020)
- Fellow of the Academy of Medical Sciences (2023)
