= Mark Kotter =

Canadian biologist (born 1971)

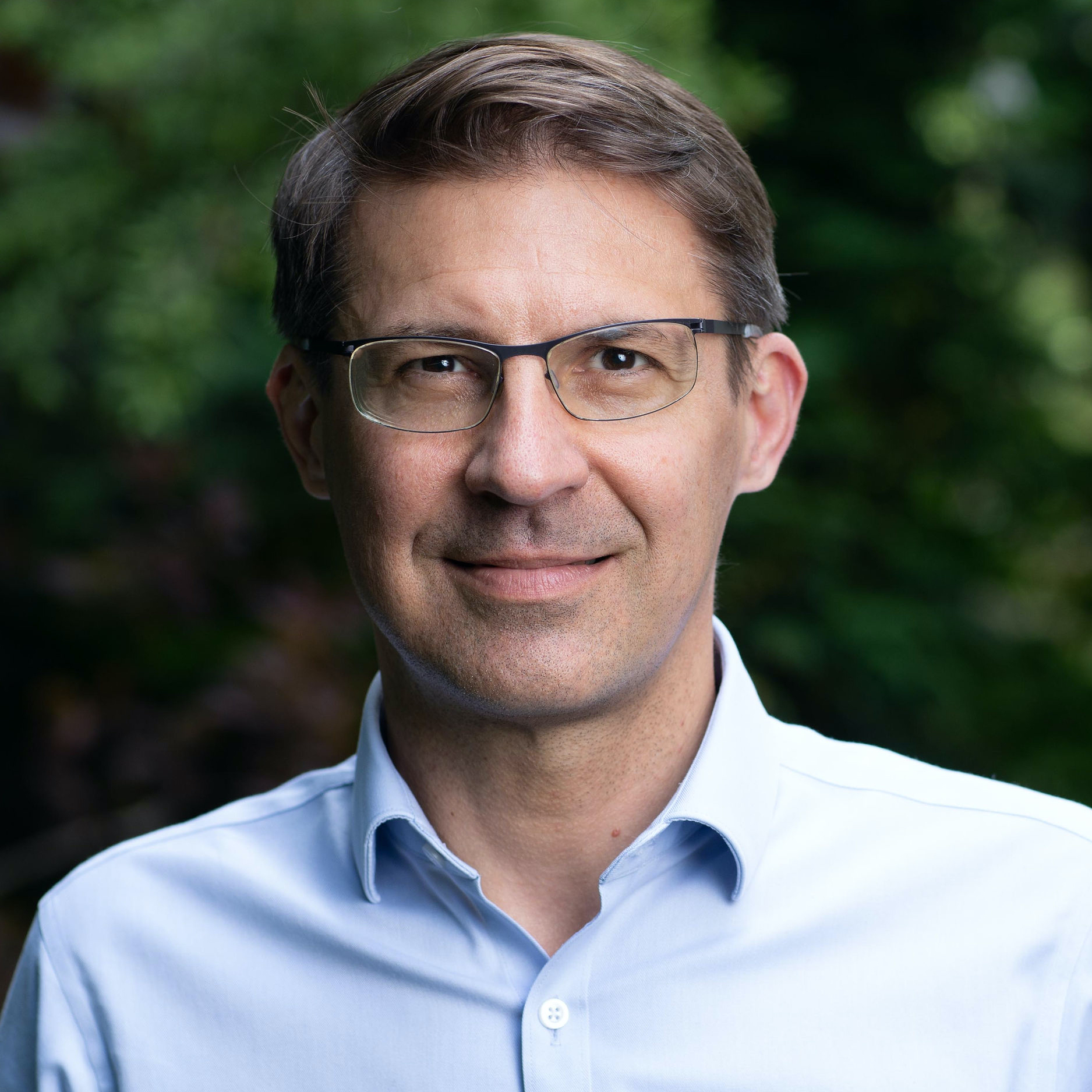
- Born: Mark Reinhard Kotter; Calgary, Canada
- Education: University of Graz, University of Cambridge
- Known for: cell programming, degenerative cervical myelopathy
- Scientific career
- Fields: Biology, Neurosciences, Medicine
- Workplaces: University of Cambridge, bit.bio, clock.bio, Myelopathy.org, Meatable
- Website: mark-kotter.medium.com

Mark Kotter (born 1971) is a Canadian neurosurgeon, biologist, and entrepreneur. He is the founder and CEO of the biotechnology company bit.bio and the co-founder of the cultured meat company Meatable.

== Early life and education ==
Kotter was born in Canada and raised in Austria, Germany, and Australia. He studied medicine in Graz and earned a PhD in stem cell biology from the University of Cambridge. He completed postgraduate medical training in Berlin and Vienna and later worked at the Max Planck Institute.

== Career ==
Kotter has made contributions to the importance of macrophages for brain regeneration, His work on cell programming includes the development of opti-ox (optimized inducible overexpression).

In 2016, Kotter founded it as Elpis Biomed, the company's name later changed to bit.bio to give a clearer indication of its function in cell coding: "bit" refers to the smallest building block in coding, while "bio" refers to the live cells that are being reprogrammed.

In 2018, Kotter co-founded the cultured meat company Meatable with Daan Luining. In 2019, Kotter co-founded the charity Myelopathy.org to provide information on Degenerative Cervical Myelopathy.
