= Sarah Teichmann =

German bioinformatician

Sarah Teichmann FRS FMedSci
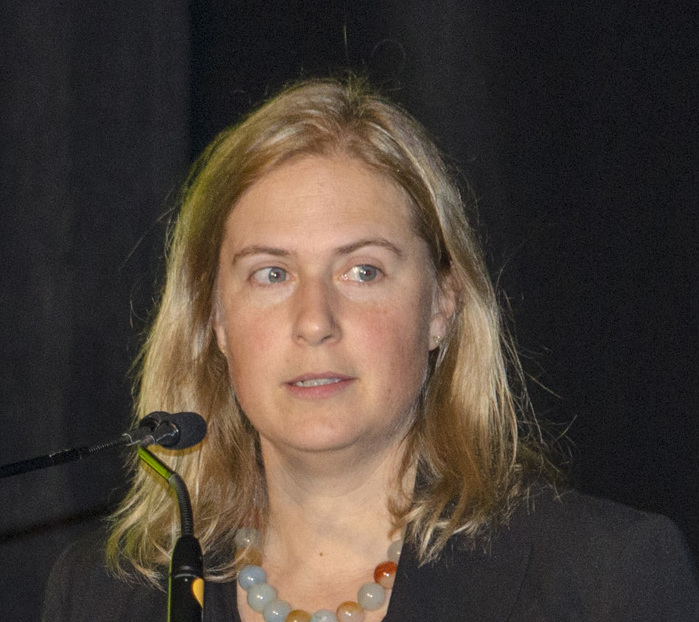
- Teichmann speaking in 2016
- Born: Sarah Amalia Teichmann; 15 April 1975 (age 51); Karlsruhe, West Germany (now Germany)
- Education: European School, Karlsruhe
- Alma mater: University of Cambridge (BA, MA, PhD)
- Children: 2
- Awards: EMBO Gold Medal (2015); Colworth Medal (2010); Lister Prize (2011); Suffrage Science award (2012); EMBO Member (2012); Crick Lecture (2012); Michael and Kate Bárány Award (2015); ISCB Fellow (2016)
- Scientific career
- Fields: Genomics; Biophysics; Immunology; Bioinformatics
- Workplaces: University of Cambridge; Laboratory of Molecular Biology; Wellcome Sanger Institute; University College London; Cavendish Laboratory; European Bioinformatics Institute
- Thesis: Genome evolution: analysing proteomes with new methods (1999)
- Doctoral advisor: Cyrus Chothia
- Doctoral students: M. Madan Babu
- Website: teichlab.org

Sarah Amalia Teichmann (born 15 April 1975) is a German scientist, the former head of cellular genetics at the Wellcome Sanger Institute and a visiting research group leader at the European Bioinformatics Institute (EMBL-EBI). She serves as director of research (equivalent to Professor) in the Cavendish Laboratory, Professor at the University of Cambridge and Cambridge Stem Cell Institute, and is a senior research fellow at Churchill College, Cambridge.

== Education ==
Teichmann was educated at the European School, Karlsruhe in Germany from 1981 to 1993 where she completed the European Baccalaureate in 1993. Teichmann went on to study the Natural Sciences Tripos at Trinity College, Cambridge and was awarded a first class Bachelor of Arts degree in 1996. In 1999, she completed her PhD supervised by Cyrus Chothia at the Laboratory of Molecular Biology (LMB) on genome evolution.

== Career and research ==
Following her PhD, Teichmann did postdoctoral research supervised by Janet Thornton at University College London and funded by the Beit Memorial Fellowships for Medical Research. From 2001-2012, she was a Medical Research Council (MRC) Programme Leader, studying patterns in protein interactions and transcriptional regulatory networks.

In 2013 Teichmann was appointed a joint position at the Wellcome Trust Sanger Institute and the European Bioinformatics Institute (EMBL-EBI). From 2005 to 2015 she served as a teaching fellow and director of studies at Trinity College, Cambridge. Since 2016 Teichmann has served as the head of Cellular Genetics at the Wellcome Trust Sanger Institute and a visiting research group leader at the EBI.

Teichmann's research investigates gene expression and protein complex assembly using both wet laboratory and computational biology techniques. In particular her research group:

...seeks to elucidate the principles of protein structure evolution, higher order protein structure and protein folding, and the principles underlying protein complex formation and organization. We have a longstanding interest in understanding gene expression regulation, and in our wetlab at the Sanger Institute use mouse T helper cells as a model of cell differentiation.

Teichmann's research has been funded by the European Research Council (ERC), the Medical Research Council (MRC), the Biotechnology and Biological Sciences Research Council (BBSRC), the Wellcome Trust, the European Molecular Biology Organization (EMBO), the Framework Programmes for Research and Technological Development and the European Cooperation in Science and Technology (COST).

As of 2015 Teichmann has supervised several PhD students to completion including Madan Babu, Varodom Charoensawan Subhajyoti De Jay Han, Sarah Kay Kummerfeld Tina Perica, and Jing Su, and several postdoctoral researchers who have gone on to become Principal investigators (PIs).

=== Awards and honours ===
Teichmann has won a number of awards. In 2010, she was awarded the Colworth Medal from the Biochemical Society. In 2012, Teichman was awarded the Francis Crick Medal and Lecture, membership of the European Molecular Biology Organization (EMBO) and the Lister Prize from the Lister Institute of Preventive Medicine. She won the Suffrage Science award in 2012. In 2015 she was awarded the Michael and Kate Bárány Award for young investigators by the Biophysical Society and the EMBO Gold Medal. Teichmann was elected a Fellow of the Academy of Medical Sciences (FMedSci) in 2015. Her citation on election reads:

Sarah Teichmann is Research Group Leader at EMBL-European Bioinformatics Institute and has made major contributions to biology over the past 15 years. A fundamental discovery was her work to define key biophysical mechanisms in protein complex assembly, showing that protein complexes assemble via distinct, ordered pathways. She showed that these assembly pathways are conserved in evolution and how they may be predicted from 3D structure. Her databases and computational analysis methods have had a broad and deep impact on the community. She represents a new breed of scientists at the interface between computational and experimental molecular biology.

Teichmann has also been an activist for women's careers in science through enabling scientists in families to advance their careers while working part-time. She chaired a Sex in Science debate at the Wellcome Trust on balancing family life with working in research. Teichmann was elected an ISCB Fellow in 2016 by the International Society for Computational Biology. She was awarded the Mary Lyon Medal by The Genetics Society in 2018.

In 2020, Teichmann was recognised on The Times 'Science Power List' for her work on the Human Cell Atlas and elected a Fellow of the Royal Society.

In 2023 Teichmann was the winner of the Federation of European Biochemical Societies (FEBS) EMBO Women in Science Award.

In 2026 Teichmann was nominated as the Laureate for Europe and awarded the 2026 L'Oréal-UNESCO for Women In Science International Award.

== Personal life ==
Teichmann has two daughters. Teichmann is the co-author of the children's language education novel Teenage Detectives, which she wrote as a teenager together with her mother Dr. Virginia Teichmann, an English-language university lecturer in Karlsruhe. In 2022, Teichmann collaborated in the production of an experimental film Constellations, which was produced by her sister, artist Esther Teichmann, and visual artist Christopher Stewart as an exploration of the Human Cell Atlas. The film was funded by the Wellcome Trust as part of the One Cell at a Time public engagement grant.
