= Broad Institute =

Biomedical and genomic research center

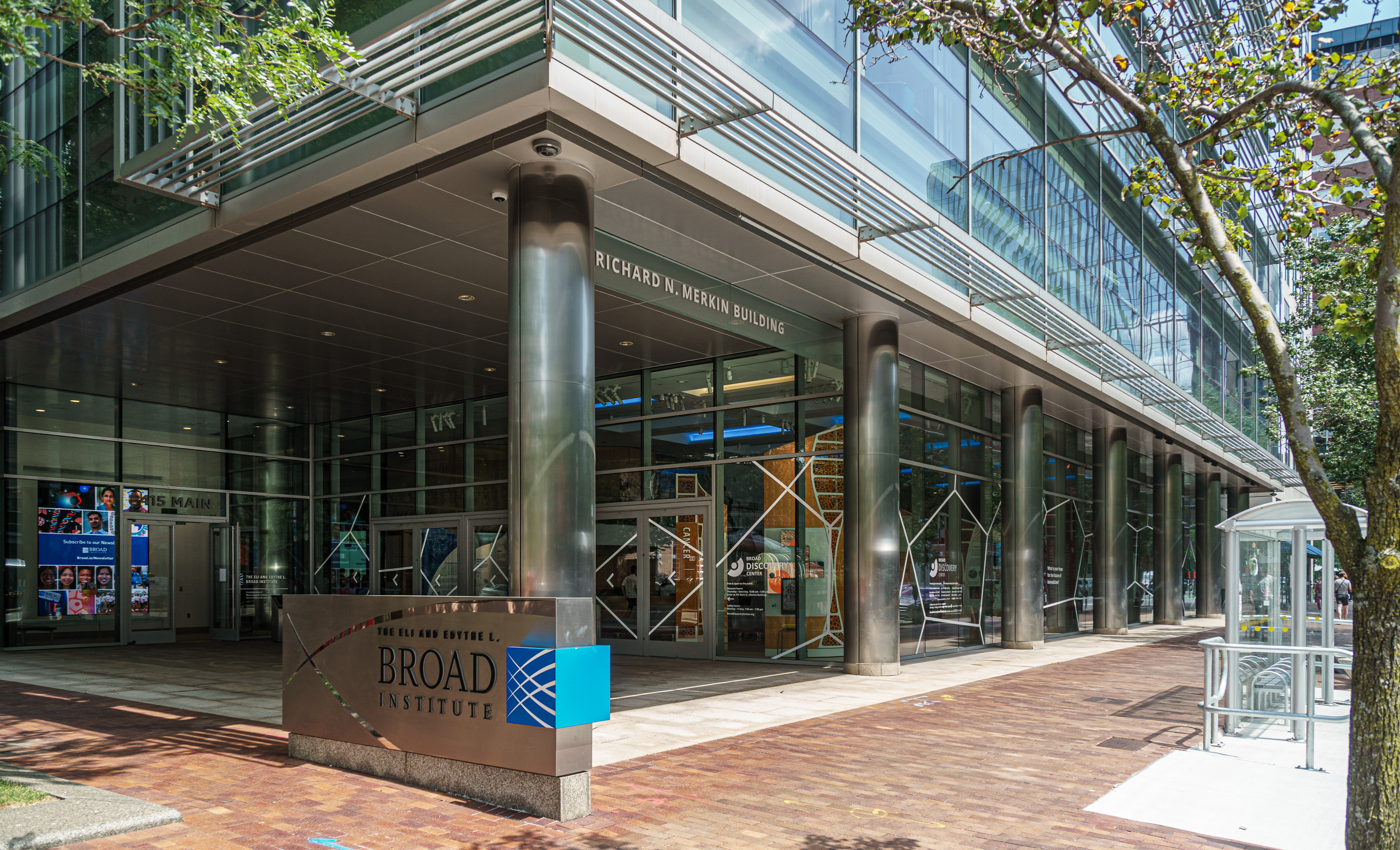
- Established: 2004; 22 years ago
- Research type: Basic (non-clinical) and translational research
- Budget: $753 million (2024)
- Field of research: Genomics, Bioinformatics, Biomedicine
- Director: Todd Golub
- Location: Cambridge, Massachusetts, United States; 42°22′05″N 71°05′13″W
- Affiliations: Massachusetts Institute of Technology; Harvard University; Beth Israel Deaconess Medical Center; Boston Children's Hospital; Brigham and Women's Hospital; Dana–Farber Cancer Institute; Massachusetts General Hospital
- Website: www.broadinstitute.org

The Broad Institute of MIT and Harvard (IPA: /broʊd/, pronunciation respelling: BROHD), or the Broad Institute, is a biomedical and genomic research center located in Cambridge, Massachusetts, United States. The institute is independently governed and supported as a 501(c)(3) nonprofit research organization under the name The Broad Institute, Inc., and it partners with the Massachusetts Institute of Technology, Harvard University, and the five Harvard teaching hospitals.

== History ==
The Broad Institute evolved from a decade of research collaborations among MIT and Harvard scientists. One cornerstone was the Center for Genome Research of the Whitehead Institute at MIT. Founded in 1982, the Whitehead Institute became a major center for genomics and the Human Genome Project. As early as 1995, scientists at the Whitehead started pilot projects in genomic medicine, forming an unofficial collaborative network among young scientists interested in genomic approaches to cancer and human genetics. Another cornerstone was the Institute of Chemistry and Cell Biology established by Harvard Medical School in 1998 to pursue chemical genetics as an academic discipline. Its screening facility was one of the first high-throughput resources opened in an academic setting. It facilitated small molecule screening projects for more than 80 research groups worldwide.

To create a new organization that was open, collaborative, cross-disciplinary and able to organize projects at any scale, planning took place in 2002–2003 among philanthropists Eli and Edythe Broad, MIT, the Whitehead Institute, Harvard and the Harvard-affiliated hospitals (in particular, the Beth Israel Deaconess Medical Center, Brigham and Women's Hospital, Children's Hospital Boston, the Dana–Farber Cancer Institute and the Massachusetts General Hospital).

The Broads made a founding gift of $100 million and the Broad Institute was formally launched in May 2004. In November 2005, the Broads announced an additional $100 million gift to the institute. On September 4, 2008, the Broads announced an endowment of $400 million to make the Broad Institute a permanent establishment. In November 2013, they invested an additional $100 million to fund a second decade of research at the institute.

During the COVID-19 pandemic in the United States, the Broad Institute ran laboratory tests for the virus for about 100 colleges and universities in the northeastern U.S. As of September 2020, the Broad was processing one out of every 20 COVID-19 tests in the nation.

== Organizational structure ==
The Broad Institute has 24 core faculty and 195 associate members from Harvard, MIT, and the Harvard-affiliated hospitals.

The Broad Institute is made up of three types of organizational units: core member laboratories, research programs, and platforms. The institute's scientific research programs include:

- Cancer Program
- Program in Medical and Population Genetics
- Genome Biology and Cell Circuits Program
- Chemical Biology Program
- Metabolism Program
- Infectious Disease Program
- Stanley Center for Psychiatric Research at Broad Institute
- Genome Sequencing and Analysis Program
- Epigenomics Program
- Vertebrate Genomics Program

The Broad Institute's platforms are teams of professional scientists who focus on the discovery, development, and optimization of the technological tools that Broad and other researchers use to conduct research. The platforms include:

- Data Sciences Platform
- Genomics Platform
- Imaging Platform
- Metabolite Profiling Platform
- Proteomics Platform
- Genetic Perturbation Platform
- Therapeutics Platform
- Therapeutics Projects Group

The Broad Institute also supports the Data Visualization Initiative led by the Institute creative director Bang Wong, which is aimed at developing data visualizations to explore and communicate research findings.

== Core members ==
The faculty and staff of the Broad Institute include physicians, geneticists, and molecular, chemical, and computational biologists. The faculty currently includes 24 core members, whose labs are primarily located within the Broad Institute, and 195 associate members, whose primary labs are located at one of the universities or hospitals.

The core members of the Broad Institute include:

- Paul Blainey is an expert in microfluidic systems to study single molecules and cells; one of the main aims of his lab is to make single-cell analysis routine.
- Erin Chen, is a biologist and a Howard Hughes Medical Institute Hanna H. Gray Fellow.
- Fei Chen is a researcher in biological engineering in the Department of Stem Cell and Regenerative Biology
- Todd Golub, a physician-researcher, is the director of the Broad Institute. He applies genomic tools to the classification and study of cancers.
- Nir Hacohen is a systems immunologist and director of the Center for Cell Circuits at the Broad Institute. He is also the director of cancer immunology at the Massachusetts General Hospital Krantz Family Center for Cancer Research.
- Gad Getz is a cancer genomics researcher who develops computational methods to analyze cancer genomes and study tumor evolution. He leads research on identifying cancer-driving mutations, molecular subtypes, and mechanisms of tumor heterogeneity and treatment resistance.
- Deborah Hung is a chemical biologist and an infectious disease physician who studies the interactions between pathogens and their hosts, with the goal of discovering new antibiotic targets.
- Steven Hyman is the director of the Stanley Center for Psychiatric Research.
- Eric Lander is the founding director of the Broad Institute. A geneticist, molecular biologist and mathematician, Lander has been a driving force in the development of genomics and a prominent leader of the Human Genome Project.
- David R. Liu is a chemist and a chemical biologist, the Director of the Merkin Institute, the inventor of DNA-templated synthesis, phage-assisted directed evolution and CRISPR/Cas9-mediated base-editing.
- Sam Peng is a chemist who researches axonal transport in neurons and the molecular dynamics of dynein motors.
- Pardis Sabeti is computational geneticist leading a group focused using infectious disease genomics and the study of human evolution to advance medicine and public health
- Stuart Schreiber is director of the Chemical Biology program. He has developed systematic ways to explore biology, especially disease biology, using small molecules toward the development of therapeutic drugs.
- Edward Scolnick is the former President of Merck Research Laboratories, former Director and current Chief Scientist of the Stanley Center for Psychiatric Research.William Sellers is a biologist and director of the institute's Cancer Program.
- Morgan Sheng is a co-director of the Stanley Center for Psychiatric Research at Broad Institute.
- Caroline Uhler is statistician working in the field of machine learning and applications in genomics.
- Xiao Wang is a Thomas D. and Virginia W. Cabot Professor at MIT in the Department of Chemistry.
- Ramnik Xavier is a director of the Klarman Cell Observatory.
- Feng Zhang is a professor at MIT who contributed to optogenetics and genome editing (CRISPR) technologies.

Former core members include:

- Myriam Heiman combines genetics, biochemistry, and cell biology to study the features that define different types of neurons and their vulnerability to disease.
- Aviv Regev is a computational biologist with interests in biological networks, gene regulation and evolution.

== Facilities ==
Facilities

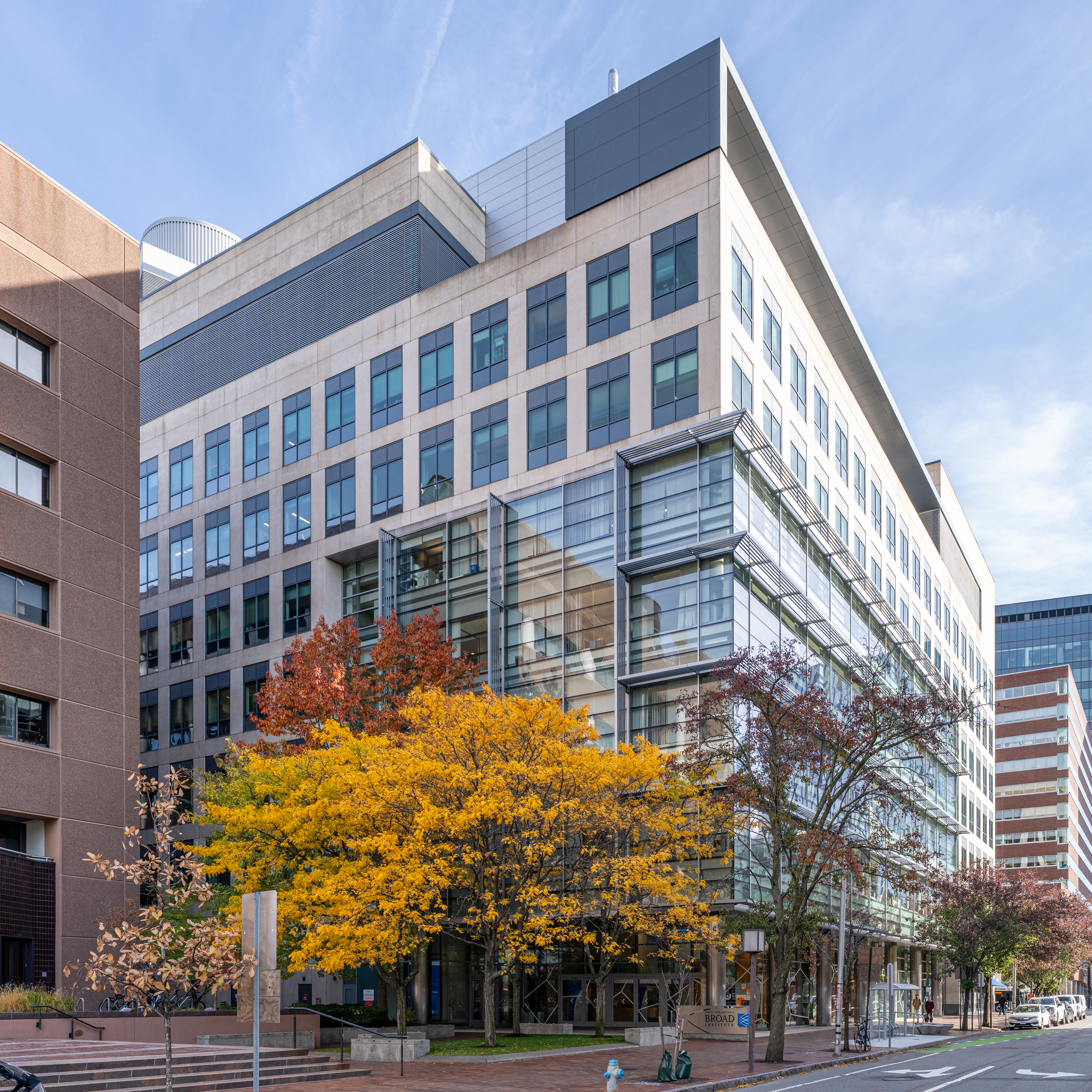
Merkin Building (415 Main St)

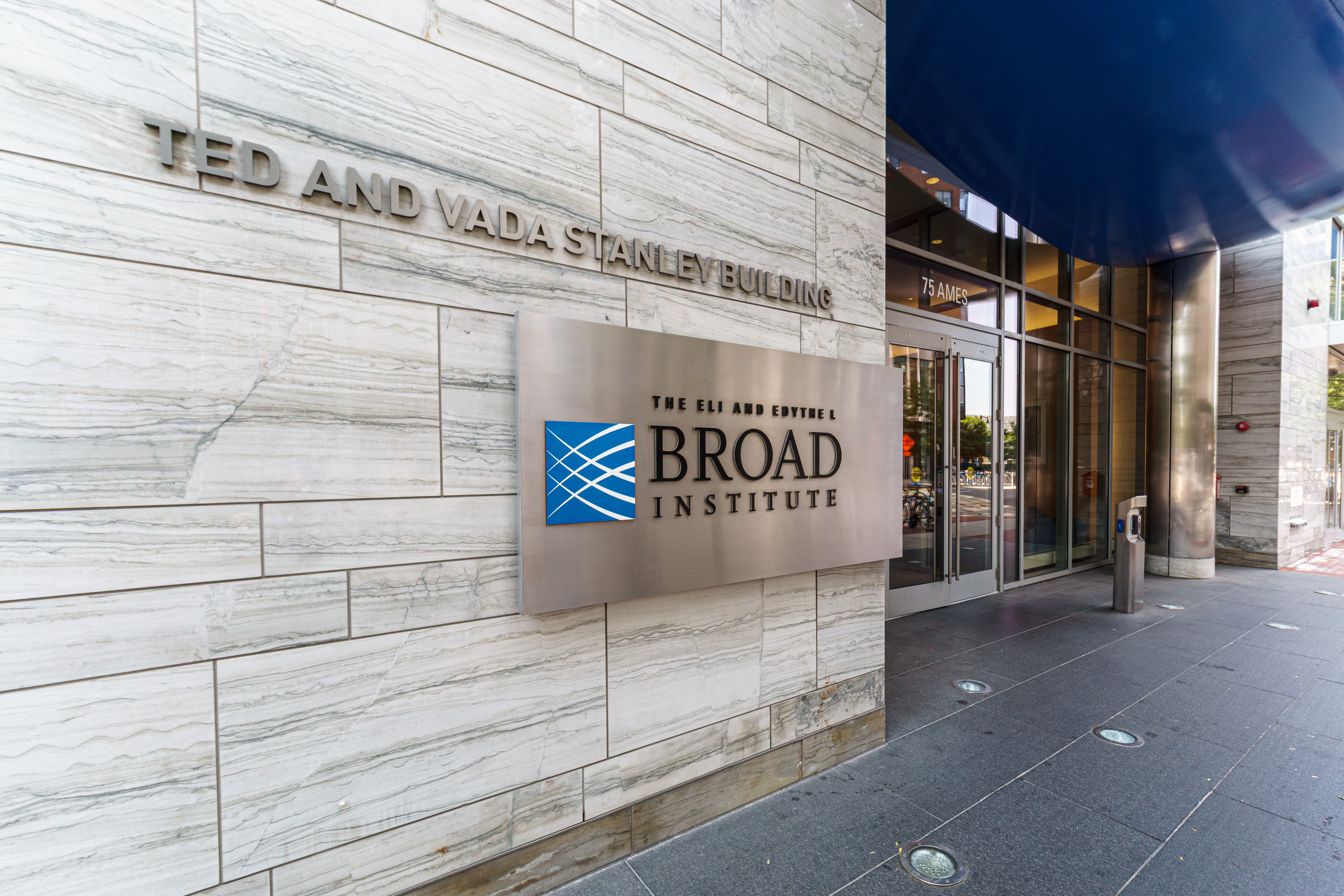
Stanley Center for Psychiatric Research (75 Ames Street)

The Broad Institute's facilities at 320 Charles Street in Cambridge, Massachusetts, house one of the largest genome sequencing centers in the world. As WICGR (Whitehead Institute/MIT Center for Genome Research), this facility was the largest contributor of sequence information to the Human Genome Project.

In February 2006, The Broad Institute expanded to a new building at 415 Main Street, adjacent to the Whitehead Institute for Biomedical Research. This seven-story 231,000-square-foot (21,500 m^{2}) building contains office, research laboratory, retail and museum space. It was designed by Architects Elkus Manfredi with Lab Planner McLellan Copenhagen and was awarded high honors by R&D Magazine. In 2011, the institute announced plans to construct an additional tower adjacent to the 415 Main Street site at 75 Ames Street.

On May 21, 2014, the Broad officially inaugurated a 375,000-square-foot research building at 75 Ames Street in Cambridge's Kendall Square. The new facility has 15 floors, 11 of which are occupied, and has LEED gold certification. As of July 2014, it has around 800 occupants.

== Funding ==
Between 2009 and 2012, the operating revenue of the institute was approximately $200 million, with 55% of that coming from federal grants. The Broad Foundation (Eli and Edythe Broad) has provided $700 million in funding to the Broad Institute as of February 2014.

The Klarman Family Foundation provided a $32.5 million grant to Broad to study cellular processes in 2012. In October 2013, Fundación Carlos Slim (the Carlos Slim Foundation) of Mexico announced a $74 million grant to Broad Institute for the SIGMA2 consortium.

In July 2014, coinciding with the publication of a new study on the genetics of schizophrenia, the Broad Institute received a $650 million gift from the Stanley Family Foundation, one of the largest private gifts ever for scientific research.

On October 10, 2017, it was reported that Deerfield Management Co. was giving $50 million to the Broad Institute of MIT and Harvard to support biology research.

Dr. Richard Merkin has been donating since 2009 in support of research, founding the Merkin Institute for Transformative Technologies in Healthcare. Dedicated on October 6, 2021, The Broad Institute's new building at 415 Main Street in Cambridge, Massachusetts was named the Richard N. Merkin Building in his honor.

== Honors ==
Since 2010, the Broad Institute has been listed on The Boston Globe's Top Places to Work. The 2014 report from Thomson Reuters' ScienceWatch entitled "The World's Most Influential Scientific Minds" recognized that 12 out of the 17 "hottest" researchers in science belonged to genomics, and 4 out of the top 5 were affiliated with the Broad Institute. Additionally, Stacey B. Gabriel of the Broad Institute topped this entire list. Twenty-eight researchers from Broad Institute have been recognized on ISI's Highly Cited, a database that recognizes the top 250 researchers in multiple areas of science.

Eric S. Lander, Stuart L. Schreiber, Aviv Regev and Edward M. Scolnick are members of the National Academy of Sciences and the Institute of Medicine. David Altshuler is a member of the Institute of Medicine. Feng Zhang received the 2014 Alan T. Waterman Award from the National Science Foundation.

In biochemistry, genetics, and molecular biology areas, the institute was ranked #1 in the "Mapping Excellence" report, a survey that assessed high-impact publications.

For its architecture, Broad's 415 Main Street building architects Elkus Manfredi Architects of Boston and AHSC McLellan Copenhagen of San Francisco received high honors in the 2007 Laboratory of the Year competition of the R&D Magazine.
