= John S. O'Neill =

British biologist

John Stuart O'Neill
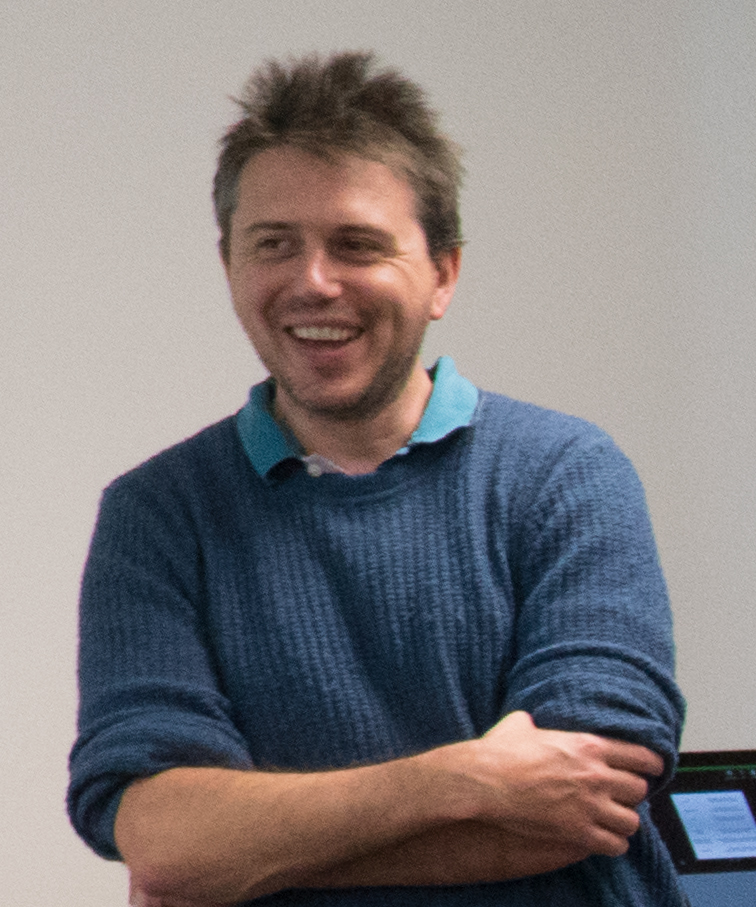
- Born: 2 June 1979 (age 47); Doncaster, United Kingdom
- Education: University of Oxford; University of Cambridge
- Scientific career
- Fields: Chronobiology
- Workplaces: Laboratory of Molecular Biology
- Thesis: The molecular biology of mammalian circadian rhythms (2007)

John Stuart O'Neill (born 2 June 1979) is a British molecular and circadian biologist. O'Neill is currently a Principal Investigator at the MRC Laboratory of Molecular Biology in Cambridge, United Kingdom. His work focuses on the fundamental mechanisms that sustain circadian rhythms in eukaryotic cells.

== Academic career ==
O'Neill studied undergraduate biochemistry at New College, Oxford. He went on to join King's College, Cambridge, where he undertook his PhD research at the MRC Laboratory of Molecular Biology, under the supervision of Michael Hastings, on the subject of cAMP signalling in the suprachiasmatic nucleus of the hypothalamus (SCN).

For his post-doctoral research, O'Neill investigated circadian rhythms in plants and algae with Andrew Millar at the University of Edinburgh and then subsequently in human cells with Akhilesh Reddy at the Institute for Metabolic Science at the University of Cambridge. During this time, O'Neill contributed to a number of papers on non-transcriptional mechanisms of circadian timekeeping, most notably a letter and an article in same edition of Nature showing that transcriptional cycles are not essential for circadian rhythms in human and algal cells, which have been cited over 700 and 400 times respectively, according to Google Scholar. These observations were subsequently independently replicated and extended but were considered controversial at the time since transcriptional feedback repression had been thought essential for circadian rhythms in eukaryotes.

O'Neill was awarded a Wellcome Trust Career Development Fellowship in 2011 and in 2013 was recruited to become an independent group leader in the Cell Biology Division of the MRC Laboratory of Molecular Biology. In 2016, he was awarded an EMBO Young Investigator Prize. In collaboration with Cairn Research, O'Neill pioneered the development of the ALLIGATOR for long-term bioluminescence imaging.

=== Current Research ===
The O'Neill group's research is focused on the evolution and mechanisms of circadian timekeeping in eukaryotic cells, and how biological clocks regulate cellular function to impact upon human health and disease. In a 2019 paper, published in the journal Cell, the group identified insulin as a primary signal synchronizing mammalian circadian rhythms with feeding time. In 2017, the lab also demonstrated that cell-autonomous circadian regulation of actin dynamics in fibroblast and other skin cells leads to differences in cell migration during wound healing that depend on the biological time of day that the wound was incurred. These findings predicted the striking 40% difference in the number of days that human burn injuries required to heal which they subsequently identified. Most recently, the O'Neill lab has been working to determine the basis for understanding metabolic oscillations in yeast.
