= Eileen Southgate =

British biologist

- Known for: mapping C. elegans nervous system
- Scientific career
- Fields: Biology, Biochemistry
- Institutions: Medical Research Council Laboratory of Molecular Biology
- Academic advisors: Max Perutz, Sydney Brenner, Vernon Ingram

Eileen Southgate is a British biologist who mapped the complete nervous system of the roundworm Caenorhabditis elegans (C. elegans), together with John White, Nichol Thomson, and Sydney Brenner. The work, done largely by hand-tracing thousands of serial section electron micrographs, was the first complete nervous system map of any animal and it helped establish C. elegans as a model organism. Among other projects carried out as a laboratory assistant at the Medical Research Council Laboratory of Molecular Biology (MRC-LMB), Southgate contributed to work on solving the structure of hemoglobin with Max Perutz and John Kendrew, and investigating the causes of sickle cell disease with Vernon Ingram.

== Career ==
Southgate spent her entire career as a laboratory technician at the Medical Research Council Laboratory of Molecular Biology (MRC LMB). She began working there in 1956, at the age of 16, after being given the option by a career officer who came to her school.

Southgate initially worked for Max Perutz and John Kendrew studying hemoglobin, the protein responsible for carrying oxygen throughout the bloodstream, and the related protein myoglobin. Among other jobs, she was tasked with helping prepare hemoglobin and myoglobin for x-ray crystallography, a technique used to determine the structures of crystallized molecules such as proteins, based on how they interact with x-ray beams to produce a diffraction pattern. Thanks in part to Southgate's assistance, Perutz and Kendrew solved crystal structures of hemoglobin and myoglobin, winning them the 1962 Nobel Prize in chemistry for "being the first to successfully identify the structures of complex proteins." Southgate carried out additional research on hemoglobin with Vernon Ingram, assisting with his research on sickle cell disease, a genetic disease in which a mutation in hemoglobin causes it to form chains (polymerize) and block blood vessels.

In 1962, Southgate briefly worked with Reuben Lebermen on his studies of plant viruses; she grew the plants, which were then infected by viruses he wanted to study, then she harvested them and purified out the viral particles. She then went to work for Tony Stretton, where after initial work involved helping him investigate β-galactosidase, she aided in his exploration of the nervous system of the parasitic nematode Ascaris lumbricoides using light microscopy. When Stretton left for the University of Wisconsin in 1971, Southgate went to work with John White, who was then a PhD student under Sydney Brenner.

Brenner was interested in establishing C. elegans as a model organism at MRC LMB, and using it to study the nervous system and its connection to genetics. In pursuit of this goal, he wanted to obtain a complete map of the C. elegans nervous system, and Southgate was tasked with helping John White and electron microscopist Nichol Thomas achieve this. C. elegans is around 100 times smaller than Ascaris (~1mm compared to ~10 cm), so they had to use a higher-resolution imaging technique, electron microscopy. Nichol Thomson helped prepare thousands of serial transverse sections of C. elegans worms, which Southgate imaged, printed out, and traced. She labeled the cell bodies, processes, and connections in each image and worked with John White to trace each neuron's journey through the worm. The process took close to 15 years and culminated in a 340-page-long paper published in 1986 in the Philosophical Transactions of the Royal Society B. Officially titled "The structure of the nervous system of the nematode Caenorhabditis elegans," it is commonly referred to by its running title, "The Mind of a Worm." They identified 302 neurons in the hermaphrodite C. elegans worm, which they grouped into 118 classes, and they discovered that the layout and connections were virtually the same in genetically-identical worms. They found close to 8,000 total synapses (cell to cell connections) which included around 2000 neuromuscular junctions, 5000 chemical synapses & 600 gap junctions (where communication is through electrical signals). Having the map helped establish C. elegans as a model organism and allowed for further research into neural circuitry and the genes involved in establishing C. elegans' neural layout. Additionally, it aided researchers in studying analogous nerves other nematodes, including Ascaris, which, due to its larger size, is more amenable to electrophysiological investigation. Southgate retired in 1993.

== Bibliography ==
- White, John Graham; Southgate, Eileen; Thomson, J. N.; Brenner, Sydney (1986-11-12). "The structure of the nervous system of the nematode Caenorhabditis elegans". Philosophical Transactions of the Royal Society of London. B, Biological Sciences. 314 (1165): 1–340. doi:10.1098/rstb.1986.0056. PMID 22462104.
