= Anne Bertolotti =

Neurological disease researcher

- Education: University of Strasbourg, France
- Awards: EMBO Young Investigator (2004) EMBO member (2013) British Society for Cell Biology Hooke Medal (2014) Fellow of the UK Academy of Medical Sciences (2017) Biochemical Society GlaxoSmithKline Award (2017)
- Scientific career
- Fields: Biochemistry Cell Biology Neuroscience
- Workplaces: IGBMC Skirball Institute of Biomolecular Medicine in the New York University School of Medicine Ecole Normale Superieure, Paris France Inserm MRC Laboratory of Molecular Biology
- Website: https://www2.mrc-lmb.cam.ac.uk/group-leaders/a-to-g/anne-bertolotti/

Anne Bertolotti FMedSci is a French biochemist and cell biologist who works as Programme Leader at the MRC Laboratory of Molecular Biology (MRC LMB) in Cambridge, UK. In 2022 she was appointed Head of the MRC LMB's Neurobiology Division. She is known for her research into the cellular defences against misfolded proteins and the mechanisms underlying their deposition, the molecular problem causative of neurodegenerative diseases.

== Education ==
Anne Bertolotti earned 2 B.S. degrees in biochemistry and plant physiology and an M.S. degree in cell and molecular biology from the Louis Pasteur University of Strasbourg, France. Bertolotti also received her PhD from the Louis Pasteur University for the discovery of hTAFII68 (now TAF15) while working with Laszlo Tora and Pierre Chambon at Institut de Genetique et de Biologie Moleculaire et Cellulaire (IGBMC).

== Academic career ==
Bertolotti did her post-doctoral research with David Ron at the Skirball Institute of Biomolecular Medicine, NYU Medical Center, New York, United States, making seminal discoveries in the mammalian unfolded protein response.

In 2001, Bertolotti became an Inserm Associate Professor at Ecole Normale Superieure, Paris. In 2006, she became a group leader at the MRC Laboratory of Molecular Biology.

Bertolotti's research focuses on protein quality control systems in cells, due to their importance as the cellular defence against the misfolded proteins that accumulate in degenerative diseases, such as Alzheimer's, Parkinson's or Huntington's disease. She is known for her work on the mechanisms governing aggregation of disease-causing proteins, for identifying components of cellular defense mechanisms against protein aggregation and for the discovery of strategies to rescue cell survival under protein misfolding stress.

One of such strategies consists of selective inhibition of an eIF2 phosphatase to reduce transient protein synthesis, allowing the cell to "catch up" with the required handling of misfolded proteins. Her group subsequently demonstrated that selective inhibitors had therapeutic effects in mouse models of Charcot-Marie-Tooth disease and Huntington's disease.

One of the inhibitors discovered in Bertolotti's lab, Sephin1, has passed through favourable Phase 1 clinical trials in 2019 and is being developed for Charcot-Marie-Tooth disease.

== Professional associations and awards ==
- 2004: EMBO Young Investigator Award
- 2013: ERC consolidator grant
- 2013: Member of EMBO
- 2014: Hooke Medal by the British Society for Cell Biology, for contributions to the understanding of abnormal protein folding
- 2017: Fellow of the Academy of Medical Sciences (FMedSci)
- 2017: GlaxoSmithKline Award from the Biochemical Society
- 2017: Wellcome Trust Principal Investigator Award
