= Tanmay A. M. Bharat =

Structural biologist

Tanmay Bharat at the MRC Laboratory of Molecular Biology

Tanmay A. M. Bharat is a programme leader in the Structural Studies Division of the MRC Laboratory of Molecular Biology. He and his group use electron tomography, together with several structural and cell biology methods to study the cell surfaces of bacteria and archaea. His work has increased the understanding of how surface molecules help in the formation of multicellular communities of prokaryotes, examples of which include biofilms and microbiomes. He has been awarded several prizes and fellowships for his work.

== Education ==
Bharat graduated with a BA in Biological Sciences from the University of Oxford, UK. His studies were supported by a Rhodes Scholarship. He then undertook research at the European Molecular Biology Laboratory in Heidelberg, Germany for his PhD working with John A. G. Briggs. He studied the structure and assembly of pathogenic viruses using cryogenic electron microscopy and tomography. His work on several viral capsid proteins improved understanding of how viruses are assembled within infected cells.

== Research ==
He subsequently joined the MRC Laboratory of Molecular Biology (LMB) in Cambridge to pursue post-doctoral research with Jan Löwe using cryo-EM to study proteins within bacterial cells. After his post-doctoral appointment concluded, he was recruited to the Sir William Dunn School of Pathology, University of Oxford as a Wellcome Trust and Royal Society Sir Henry Dale Fellow. After obtaining tenure at Oxford, he moved back to the LMB as a programme leader in 2022. His research investigates how bacteria and archaea use their surface molecules to form multicellular communities. For instance, during human infections bacteria form biofilms that help them evade antibiotics. The group also use electron tomography.

== Scientific publications ==
Bharat is the author or co-author of over 65 scientific publications. These include:

- Hannah Ochner, Buse Isbilir, Sonja Blasche, David Scheidweiler, Yuexuan Zhang, Zhexin Wang, Tom Smith, Caterina Franco, Rob Bradley, Kiran R. Patil, Tanmay A.M. Bharat. (2026) Subcellular chemical mapping using correlated cryogenic electron and mass spectrometry imaging. Nature Methods 23, 1174-1184
- Andriko von Kügelgen, C Keith Cassidy, Sofie van Dorst, Lennart L Pagani, Christopher Batters, Zephyr Ford, Jan Löwe, Vikram Alva, Phillip J Stansfeld, Tanmay A.M. Bharat (2024) Membraneless channels sieve cations in ammonia-oxidizing marine archaea. Nature 230, 230-236
- Jan Böhning, Miles Graham, Suzanne C Letham, Luke K Davis, Ulrike Schulze, Phillip J Stansfeld, Robin A Corey, Philip Pearce, Abul K Tarafder, Tanmay AM Bharat (2023) Biophysical basis of filamentous phage tactoid-mediated antibiotic tolerance in P. aeruginosa. 14, article number 8429
- Jan Böhning, Mnar Ghrayeb, Conrado Pedebos, Daniel K. Abbas, Syma Khalid, Liraz Chai & Tanmay A. M. Bharat (2022) Donor-strand exchange drives assembly of the TasA scaffold in Bacillus subtilis biofilms. Nature Communications 13, article number 7082.
- Tanmay A.M. Bharat, Andriko von Kügelgen & Vikram Alva (2021) Molecular Logic of Prokaryotic Surface Layer Structures. Trends in Microbiology May;29(5):405-415.
- Charlotte Melia, Jani Bolla, Stefan Lanwermeyer, Daniel Mihaylov, Patrick Hoffmann, Jiandong Huo, Michael Wozny, Louis Elfari, Jan Böhning, Ray Owens, Carol Robinson, George O'Toole & Tanmay A.M. Bharat (2021) Architecture of cell-cell junctions in situ reveals a mechanism for bacterial biofilm inhibition. Proceedings of the National Academy of Sciences of the United States of America 118 (31).
- Abul K. Tarafder, Andriko von Kügelgen, Adam J. Mellul & Tanmay A. M. Bharat (2020) Phage liquid crystalline droplets form occlusive sheaths that encapsulate and protect infectious rod-shaped bacteria. Proceedings of the National Academy of Sciences of the United States of America 117 (9), pages 4724-4731.
- Andriko von Kügelgen, Haiping Tang., Gail Hardy, Danguole Kureisaite-Ciziene, Yves Brun, Phillip Stansfeld, Carol Robinson, & Tanmay A.M. Bharat (2020) In Situ Structure of an Intact Lipopolysaccharide-Bound Bacterial Surface Layer. Cell 180 (2): 348-358

== Awards ==
Bharat has been awarded many prizes and fellowships. These include a 2018 Vallee Research Scholarship, the 2019 EMBL John Kendrew Award the 2020 Philip Leverhulme Prize for Biological Sciences, the 2021 Eppendorf Award for Young European Investigators, and the 2021 Lister Prize, the 2022 Colworth Medal from the Biochemical Society, the 2023 Fleming Prize from the Microbiology Society, the 2024 Blavatnik Award UK (Life Sciences Finalist) and the 2025 EMBO Gold Medal.
