= Yanlan Mao =

British biologist and academic

- Education: University of Cambridge
- Scientific career
- Workplaces: University College London; Medical Research Council (UK)
- Thesis: Adhesion molecules in Drosophila EGFR signalling and retinal development (2008)

Yanlan Mao is a British biologist who is a professor at University College London. Her research considers cell biology and the molecular mechanisms that underpin tissue formation. She was awarded the Royal Microscopical Society Medal for Life Sciences in 2021.

== Early life ==
Mao's father was a mathematician, and she spent her childhood at academic conferences. She considered pursuing a career as a mathematician, but then realised the beauty of biology; in particular, she was fascinated by patterns in nature. She studied natural sciences at the University of Cambridge and earned her doctorate at the Medical Research Council Laboratory of Molecular Biology in Cambridge. Her doctoral research considered drosophila cell signalling and epithelial patterning. Mao joined Cancer Research UK as a postdoctoral research fellow, where she became interested in tissue mechanics and the role of mechanical forces in cell division. During her postdoc, she became more interested in physical modelling.

== Research and career ==
In 2014, Mao launched her own independent laboratory at University College London. Her research focusses on how tissues achieve their appropriate size and three-dimensional architecture. It was previously unclear how the mechanical properties of cells influence the formation of organs. She makes use of Drosophila genetics and computational modelling to understand the mechanisms that underpin tissue growth.

== Awards and honours ==
- 2018 L'Oréal UNESCO Women in Science Fellowship
- 2018 Lister Institute Research Prize
- 2019 EMBO Young Investigator Programme
- 2019 Biophysical Society Early Career Award in Mechanobiology
- 2020 BSCB Women in Cell Biology Early Career Medal
- 2021 Royal Microscopical Society Medal for Life Sciences
- 2022 MRC Senior Non-Clinical Fellowship

== Selected publications ==
- Yanlan Mao; Alexander L Tournier; Andreas Hoppe; Lennart Kester; Barry James Thompson; Nicolas Tapon (10 September 2013). "Differential proliferation rates generate patterns of mechanical tension that orient tissue growth". The EMBO Journal. 32 (21): 2790–2803. doi:10.1038/emboj.2013.197. ISSN 0261-4189. PMC 3817460. PMID 24022370. Wikidata Q42092367.
- Yanlan Mao; Alexander L Tournier; Paul A. Bates; Jonathan E Gale; Nicolas Tapon; Barry James Thompson (1 January 2011). "Planar polarization of the atypical myosin Dachs orients cell divisions in Drosophila". Genes & Development. 25 (2): 131–136. doi:10.1101/gad.610511. ISSN 0890-9369. PMC 3022259. PMID 21245166. Wikidata Q42573858.
- John R Davis; Andrei Luchici; Fuad Mosis; et al. (19 March 2015). "Inter-cellular forces orchestrate contact inhibition of locomotion". Cell. 161 (2): 361–373. doi:10.1016/j.cell.2015.02.015. ISSN 0092-8674. PMC 4398973. PMID 25799385. Wikidata Q28972395.
