= Gregory Jefferis =

British neuroscientist

Gregory Stephen Xavier Edward Jefferis is a British neuroscientist known for his work on the circuit basis of olfactory perception in the vinegar fly, Drosophila melanogaster. He is a tenured Programme Leader at the MRC Laboratory of Molecular Biology in Cambridge (UK) and associated with the Department of Zoology at the University of Cambridge.

== Education ==
Jefferis studied Natural Sciences at the University of Cambridge, graduating with a BA from St John's College, Cambridge in 1998. He was awarded a PhD in Neurosciences for his work on the 'Wiring specificity in the olfactory system of Drosophila' in 2003, supervised by Liqun Luo at Stanford University. He became a Fellow of St John's College in 2004.

== Career and contributions to science ==
Jefferis has made significant contributions to our understanding of how neural circuits process sensory information and transform it into behavior. His PhD uncovered principles of brain development using the olfactory system of the vinegar fly, Drosophila melanogaster. He found that central neurons in the brain are pre-specified to form connections with specific incoming sensory neurons. Surprisingly, central dendrites can target independently of incoming sensory axons, suggesting a principle of independent coarse maps refined by contact-mediated matching. Returning to Cambridge in 2004 as a Wellcome research fellow, Jefferis combined genetic single cell labelling and image registration to build a 3D atlas of higher olfactory centers in Drosophila, showing that odors of different behavioral significance are spatially segregated.

Jefferis joined the Neurobiology Division at the MRC Laboratory of Molecular Biology as a tenure-track Programme Leader in 2008 and was awarded tenure in 2014. His group, in collaboration with Barry Dickson, generated the first comprehensive description of circuit-level sex differences in the fly brain, overturning the prevailing view that sex-specific behaviors originated from largely isomorphic circuitry. His group subsequently showed that higher-order olfactory neurons form a bidirectional switch that sex-specifically routes pheromone signals.

Jefferis' group has also made significant efforts in the development of experimental and computational tools for circuit mapping. He is also a principal investigator of the Virtual Fly Brain online resource.

In 2016, he was the lead applicant of a Wellcome Trust Collaborative Award that is using EM connectomics to study the neural circuit basis of memory storage and retrieval; this established the Drosophila Connectomics group at the Department of Zoology, University of Cambridge. He has also received Starting and Consolidator grants from the European Research Council.

== Awards and honors ==
Jefferis has received numerous awards through his career. For his PhD work, Jefferis received a Harold M. Weintraub Graduate Student Award of the Fred Hutchinson Cancer Research Center in 2003 and was selected to deliver the Elkins Memorial lecture at the Neurobiology of Drosophila Meeting in Cold Spring Harbor. In 2012, Jefferis was appointed to the EMBO Young Investigator Programme, and in 2016 was elected to the FENS Kavli Network of Excellence. In 2018, he was announced as the winner of the Royal Society's Francis Crick Medal and Lecture "for his fundamental discoveries concerning the development and functional logic of sensory information processing". He was elected a Fellow of the Royal Society in 2025.
