= Cambridge Institute for Medical Research =

Research institute

Cambridge Institute for Medical Research (CIMR)
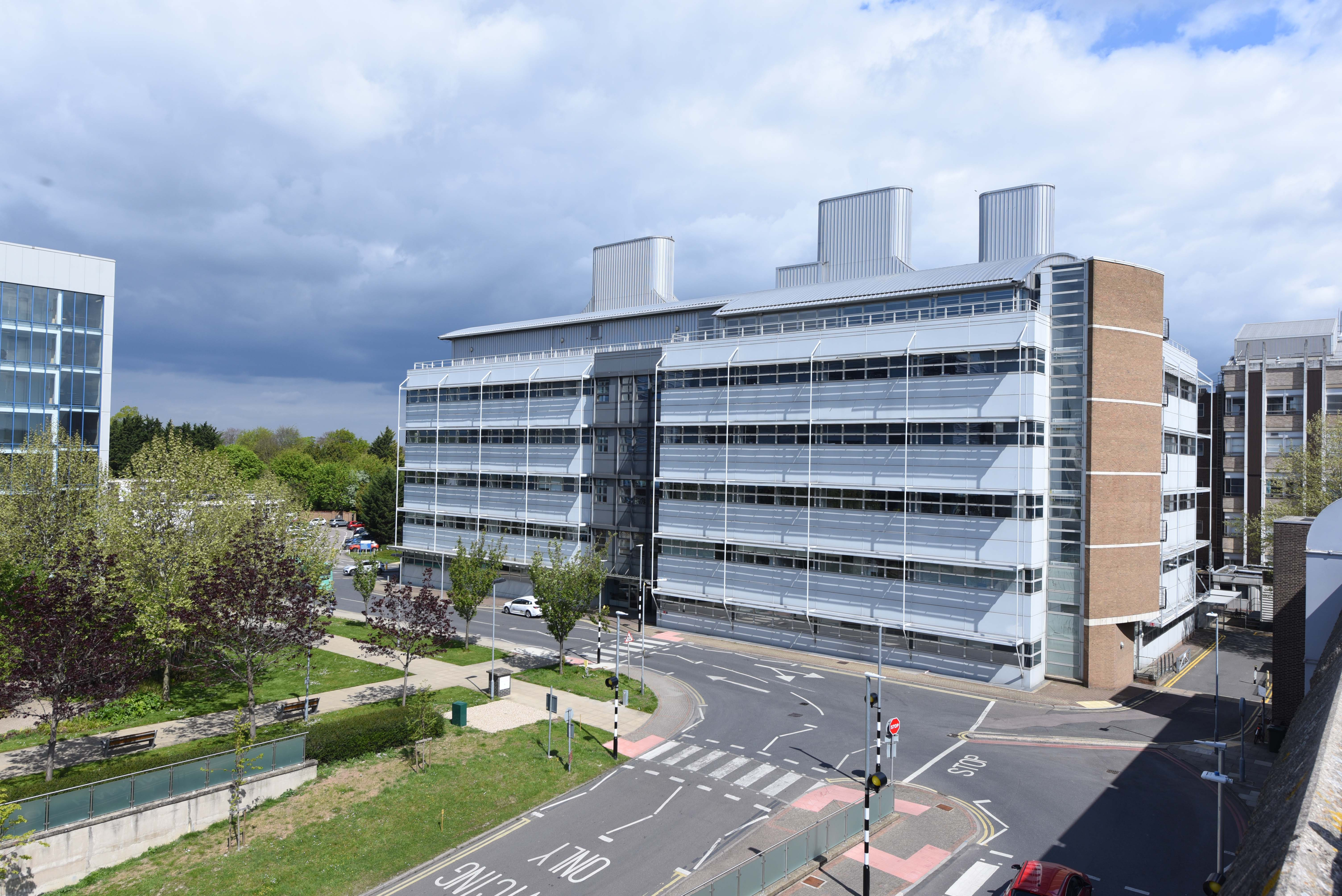
- Established: 1998
- Director: Professor Julian Rayner
- Location: The Keith Peters Building, Hills Road, Cambridge CB2 0XY
- Website: https://www.cimr.cam.ac.uk/

The Cambridge Institute for Medical Research (CIMR) is an interdisciplinary research institute within the University of Cambridge School of Clinical Medicine. CIMR is on the Cambridge Biomedical Campus, in the Keith Peters Building, a dedicated research building that it shares with the Medical Research Council's Mitochondrial Biology Unit.

CIMR's mission is to determine the molecular mechanisms of disease in order to advance human health. CIMR’s research is centered on cellular homeostasis and the diseases that occur when it is disrupted – either by inherited genetic variation or by infection. Bringing together clinical scientists and fundamental biologists, CIMR has deep expertise in protein folding and quality control, membrane trafficking and organelle biology, and how these processes are disrupted in three broad disease areas: rare genetic disease, neurological disease and intracellular infections. Research funding for CIMR research comes from a number of charity and government sources, including the Wellcome Trust.

== History ==
Sir David Keith Peters was head of the School of Clinical Medicine when CIMR was established in 1998. With significant funding from Wellcome and MRC, a purpose-built, seven storey building with extensive lab facilities was constructed to enable study of the molecular mechanisms of disease. Professor Jenefer Blackwell was CIMR’s first Director (1998–2002), followed by Professor Paul Luzio (2002–2012), Professor Gillian Griffiths (2012–2017), Professor Paul Luzio (Interim Head, 2017–2019), and Professor Julian Rayner (2019–).

== Funding ==
Core support has provided by the Wellcome Trust, who continue support projects within the institute.

== Current principal investigators ==
Current principal investigators include Gillian Griffiths,Paul Luzio, Julian Rayner, Randy Read, David Ron and David Rubinsztein.

== Outputs and Impacts ==
Up to January 2023, almost 3,000 original research articles have been published featuring authors with CIMR addresses. There are over 300,000 combined further citations of these papers. Additional CIMR outputs and impacts include:

- trained over 130 PhD students
- filed 50 patents
- founded five spin-out companies, three of which exited through trade sale to corporates
- undertaken over 20 major collaborations with industrial partners.

CIMR also has an active public engagement programme, with recent highlights including Inspiring Scientists at CIMR, a four day long hands-on programme providing experience in research and support with University applications for Year 12 students across Cambridgeshire and contributions to RareFest and the Cambridge Science Festival.

As the first dedicated research institute within the School of Clinical Medicine, CIMR has also provided a springboard for the establishment of further Institutes, many of which were founded by Principal Investigators working in CIMR: Hutchison/MRC Research Centre, CRUK Cambridge Institute, Institute of Metabolic Sciences, Anne McClaren Laboratory for Regenerative Medicine, Cambridge Stem Cell Institute, The Cambridge Institute for Therapeutic Immunology and Infectious Disease.
