= Julian Rayner =

New Zealand malaria researcher

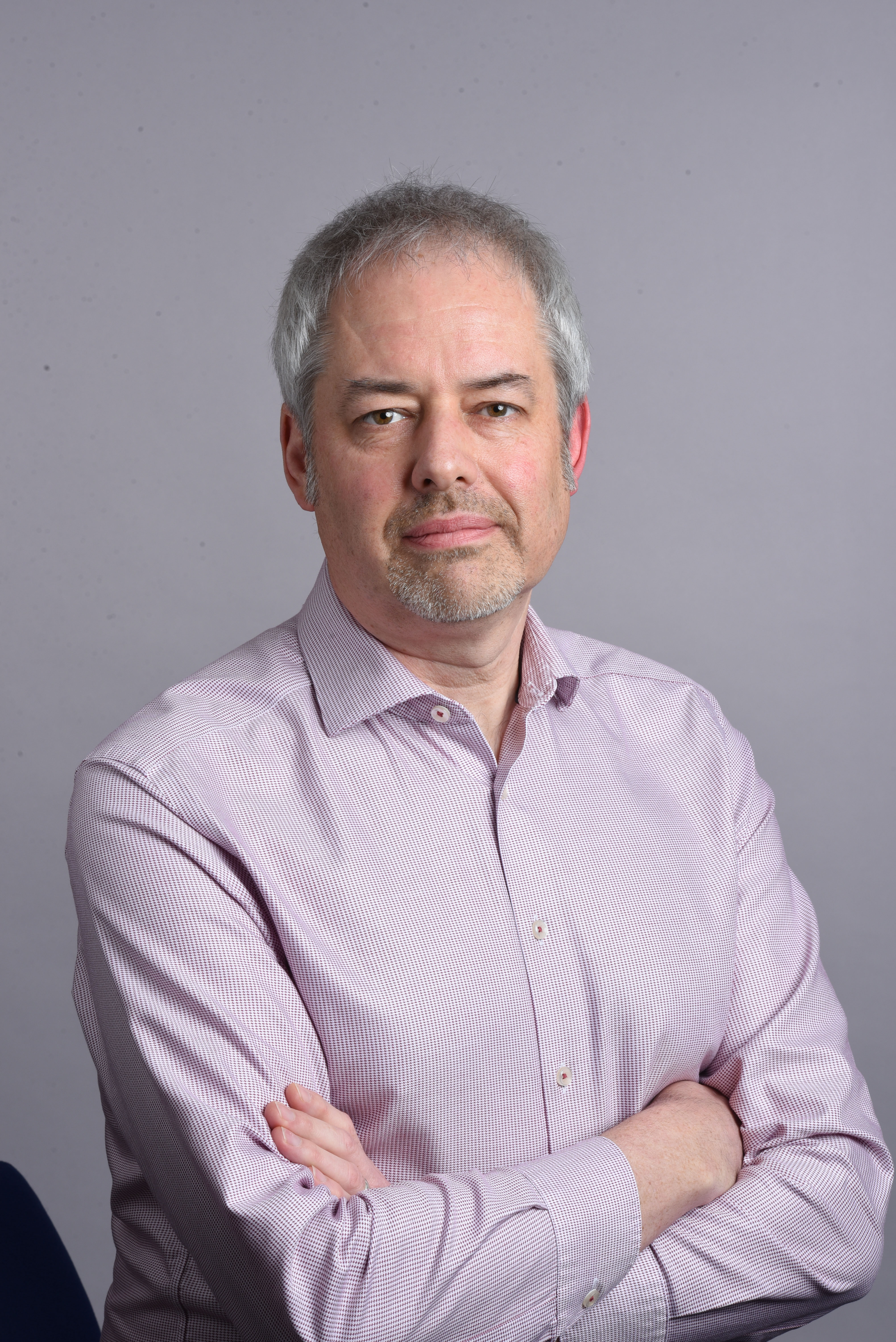
- Professor Julian Rayner Photo: Stephen Bond
- Born: Julian Charles Rayner
- Education: University of Cambridge (PhD) Lincoln University (New Zealand) (BSc(Hons))
- Scientific career
- Workplaces: MRC Laboratory of Molecular Biology; Centers for Disease Control and Prevention, Atlanta; University of Alabama at Birmingham; Wellcome Sanger Institute; University of Cambridge
- Thesis: Sorting of membrane proteins in the yeast secretory pathway (1997)
- Website: www.cimr.cam.ac.uk/staff/professor-julian-rayner-fmedsci

Julian Charles Rayner is a New Zealand-British malaria researcher and academic. He is Professor of Cell Biology and the Director of the Cambridge Institute for Medical Research (CIMR), part of the University of Cambridge School of Clinical Medicine. He was previously a member of academic faculty at the Wellcome Sanger Institute and Director of Wellcome Connecting Science.

Julian Rayner became Director of CIMR in 2019.

== Education ==
Rayner was born in New Zealand, and completed his undergraduate studies at Lincoln University, before undertaking his PhD at the University of Cambridge. His doctoral research investigated the sorting of membrane proteins in the yeast secretory pathway while based at the Medical Research Council (MRC) Laboratory of Molecular Biology (LMB) in Cambridge.

== Career and research ==
Rayner began working on malaria parasites during a postdoctoral fellowship at the Centers for Disease Control and Prevention in Atlanta. Rayner's first faculty position was at the University of Alabama Birmingham, where he was an assistant professor between 2002 and 2008.

Rayner joined the Sanger Institute as a Group Leader in 2008, and became a Senior Group Leader in 2013. In 2014 he was appointed as the Director of Connecting Science for the Wellcome Genome Campus, a role he held until 2024.

In 2019, he joined the University of Cambridge, as the director of the Cambridge Institute for Medical Research. He was also elected to the Chair of Cell Biology in the School of Clinical Medicine.

Rayner's research interests focus on how Plasmodium parasites recognise, invade and manipulate human red blood cells with the goal of identifying and prioritising new drug and vaccine targets. Working with collaborators such as Beatrice Hahn, he has demonstrated that Plasmodium falciparum is likely to have originated in gorillas, rather than chimpanzees or ancient humans. Together with colleagues at the Sanger Institute, Rayner identified a key ligand which is essential for erythrocyte invasion by P. falciparum and therefore has significant anti-malarial potential. He co-led collaborative teams that carried out the first large-scale genetic screens in Plasmodium parasites, and—with colleagues at the KEMRI-Wellcome Trust Institute in Kenya—established that the rare blood group Dantu protects individuals from malaria by increasing the tension of red blood cells, reducing the ability of P. falciparum parasites to invade them.

=== Public engagement ===
In March 2011, Rayner took part in the Argon Zone of the science engagement activity I'm a Scientist, Get me out of here!, where he won £500 to put towards a science communication project. Rayner used the prize money to create compact disc versions of the interactive game Malaria Challenge and distributed copies freely to schools in the UK.

=== Honours and awards ===
In 2015, he was awarded CA Wright Memorial medal by the British Society for Parasitology.

In 2022, Rayner was elected as a Fellow of EMBO, the European Molecular Biology Organization.

In 2023, Rayner was elected to the Fellowship of the Academy of Medical Sciences in the UK.
