= Sean Munro =

British biologist

Sean Munro FRS
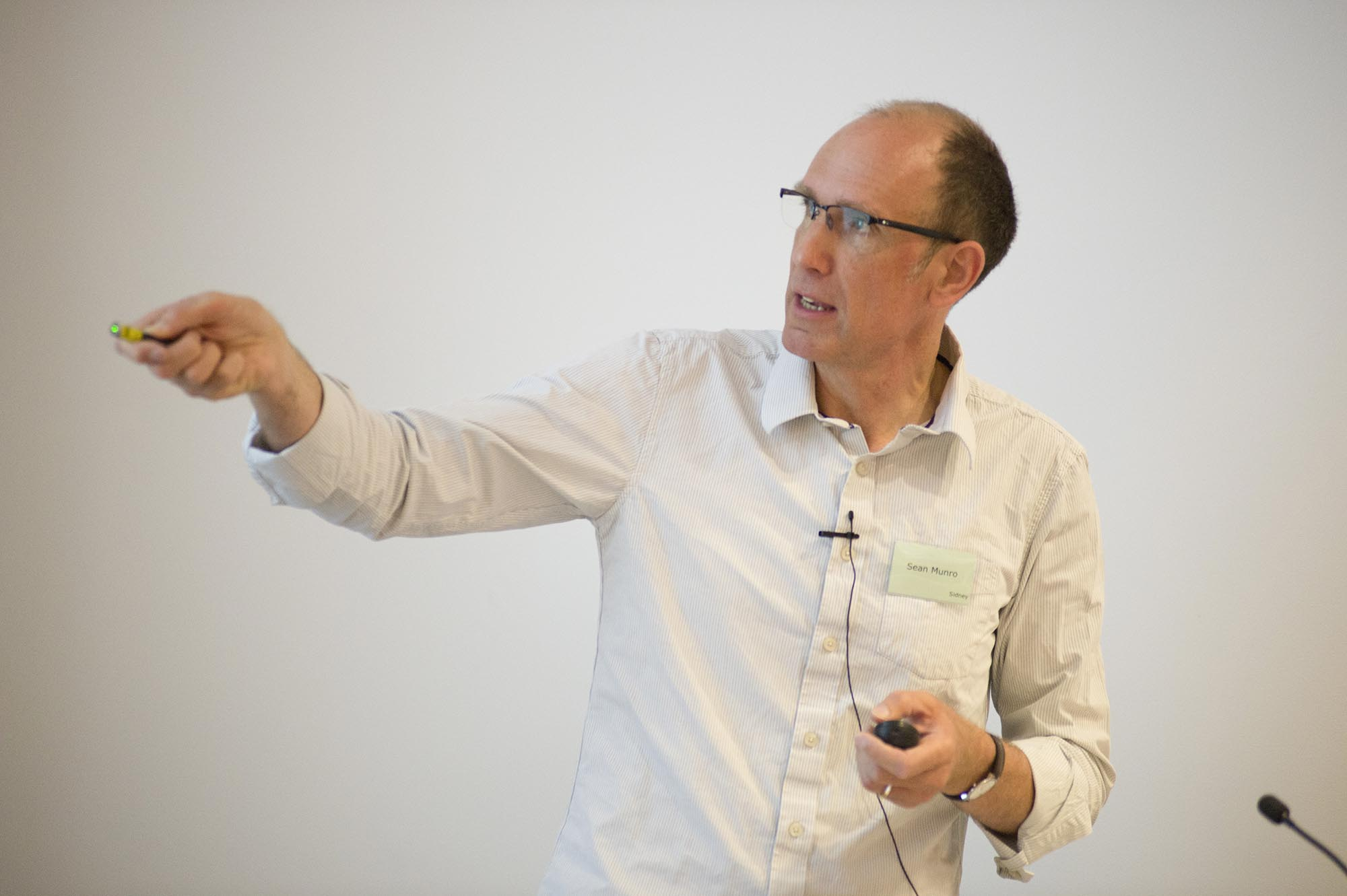
- Education: Netherhall School
- Alma mater: University of Oxford (BA); University of Cambridge (PhD)
- Awards: EMBO Member (1997)
- Scientific career
- Fields: Cell biology
- Institutions: Laboratory of Molecular Biology
- Thesis: Structure and function of the 70kd heat shock protein and its relatives (1987)
- Doctoral advisor: Hugh Pelham
- Website: www2.mrc-lmb.cam.ac.uk/group-leaders/h-to-m/sean-munro

Sean Munro FRS is a Group Leader at the Medical Research Council (MRC) Laboratory of Molecular Biology (LMB). From 2012 until 2023, he served as head of the Cell Biology Division.
