= Andrew P. Carter =

British structural biologist

Andrew P Carter
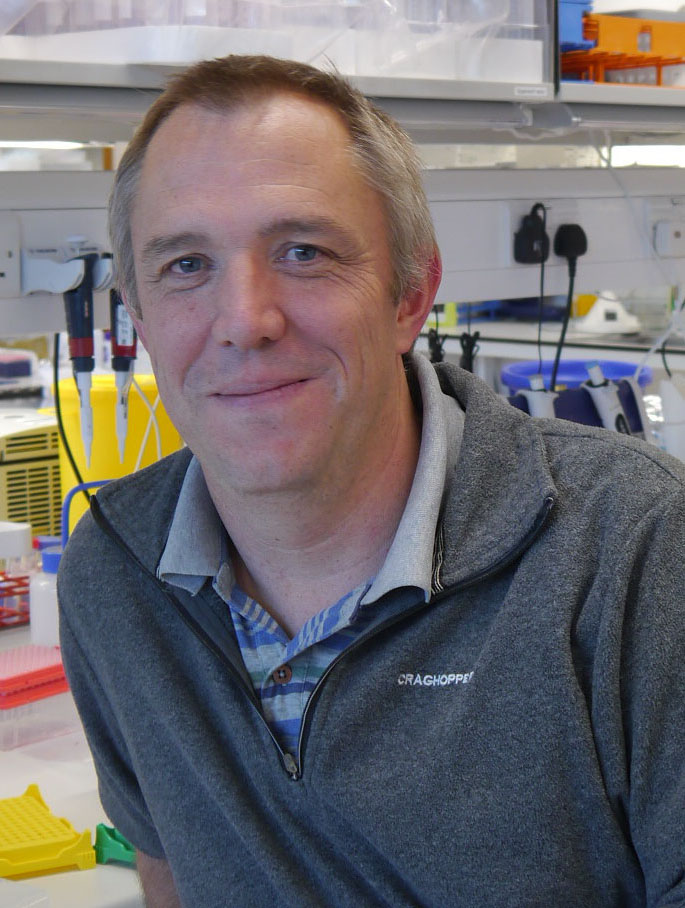
- Education: University of Oxford (MBiochem); MRC Laboratory of Molecular Biology (PhD)
- Awards: EMBO Member (2016)
- Scientific career
- Fields: Structural biology
- Workplaces: University of California, San Francisco; MRC Laboratory of Molecular Biology
- Doctoral advisor: Venki Ramakrishnan
- Other academic advisors: Ron Vale
- Website: www2.mrc-lmb.cam.ac.uk/groups/cartera/

Andrew P. Carter FRS is a British structural biologist who works at the Medical Research Council (MRC) Laboratory of Molecular Biology (LMB) in Cambridge, UK. He is known for his work on the microtubule motor dynein.

== Education ==
Carter studied Biochemistry at the University of Oxford, graduating in 1999. He obtained a PhD in 2003 from the MRC Laboratory of Molecular Biology where he worked with Venki Ramakrishnan on the ribosome. He was a member of the team in Ramakrishnan's lab that solved the first X-ray crystal structure of the small (30S) ribosomal subunit. Carter also determined structures of 30S bound to antibiotics and bound to the initiation factor IF1. Ramakrishnan shared the Nobel prize in Chemistry for the team's work on the 30S.

== Career and research ==
Carter was a post-doc in Ron Vale's lab at University of California, San Francisco from 2003 to 2010. During his post-doc, he studied the molecular motor protein, dynein using X-ray crystallography and single molecule fluorescence microscopy.

He became a group leader at MRC Laboratory of Molecular Biology in Cambridge in 2010 where he uses X-ray crystallography, electron microscopy, and single molecule microscopy assays to understand how dynein transports cargo. His group solved X-ray crystal structures of the dynein motor domain showing how it generates force to pull cargos along microtubules and reconstituted a recombinant dynein, showing how its processive movement is activated by cofactors/cargo adaptors. His group used cryoEM to solve the structure of dynein's cofactor dynactin and the full length dynein complex. They showed how dynein and dynactin come together in the presence of cargos and how this activates transport.

=== Grants, awards and honours ===
- 2001 Clare College Junior Research Fellowship
- 2002 Max Perutz PhD Student Prize (MRC Laboratory of Molecular Biology)
- 2003 Agouron Institute / Jane Coffin Childs Memorial Fund Fellowship
- 2006 Leukemia & Lymphoma Society Special Fellow Award
- 2010 Fellow of Clare College and Director of Studies for Biological Sciences
- 2012 EMBO Young Investigator Program
- 2012 Wellcome Trust New Investigator Award
- 2016 Member, European Molecular Biology Organisation (EMBO)
- 2018 Wellcome Trust Investigator Award
- 2024 Fellow of the Royal Society
