= Judith Kimble =

American professor and biochemist

- Born: Judith Elisabeth Kimble
- Education: University of California, Berkeley; University of Colorado Boulder
- Scientific career
- Fields: Molecular regulation of animal development in Caenorhabditis elegans
- Workplaces: University of Wisconsin–Madison; Laboratory of Molecular Biology
- Thesis: The Post-embryonic cell lineages of the hermaphrodite and male gonads in Caenorhabditis elegans (1978)
- Doctoral students: Julie Ahringer
- Website: www.biochem.wisc.edu/faculty/kimble

Judith Kimble is a Henry Vilas Professor of Biochemistry, Molecular Biology, Medical Genetics and Cell and Regenerative Biology at the University of Wisconsin–Madison and Investigator with the Howard Hughes Medical Institute (HHMI). Kimble’s research focuses on the molecular regulation of animal development.

== Education and training ==
Judith Kimble received her Bachelor's degree in biomedical sciences from the University of California, Berkeley in 1971. She originally intended to become a physician. However, whilst in her last year as an undergraduate, she took a temporary job at the University of Copenhagen Medical School, she taught medical students about the structure and function of human organs, which, combined with her undergraduate studies in human embryology, sparked an interest in the "basic problems in animal development."

She began her graduate studies in 1974 at the University of Colorado Boulder. There, she worked with molecular biologist David Hirsh who was studying the model organism Caenorhabditis elegans. Kimble then moved to the MRC Laboratory of Molecular Biology, where she spent four years as a postdoctoral fellow working with Sir John Sulston on the control of organogenesis. During the course of her work, Kimble found a special somatic cell at the tip of the gonad which tells nearby germ cells - reproductive cells - how to divide. When she destroyed the distal tip cell, germ cells stopped dividing. When she moved the somatic cell to a different place, germ cells started dividing in that new location. This was the first time a single cell with such an oversight function had been identified.

== Early career ==
Kimble moved to the University of Wisconsin–Madison in 1983 where she took up an assistant professorship position. Discovery of the distal tip cell gave her the means of exploring the control of germline stem cells. She then began to examine the genetic and molecular mechanisms responsible for germline stem cells and the processes by which germ cells develop into sperm or egg cells.

== Later work ==
Kimble's more recent work has focused on sexual dimorphism in order to understand how organs with different shapes, sizes and tissues can be made from the same starting cells.

== Achievements ==
Kimble has published more than 150 scientific articles and is listed on two US-issued patents. She has trained more than 30 postdoctoral fellows and graduate students, including Tim Schedl, and Julie Ahringer. She was President of the Genetics Society of America for 2000.

She was elected to the American Academy of Arts and Sciences in 1995 and the American Philosophical Society in 2002. She was an investigator with the Howard Hughes Medical Institute from 1994–2019 and a member of the National Academy of Sciences. She served on the President’s Committee on the National Medal of Science (2012–2014) and as a chair of the committee in 2015. In 2024 she was awarded the Wiley Prize.
