= Guy Salvesen =

South African-born biochemist

Guy Salvesen is a South African-born biochemist, best known for his work in the field of apoptosis. His research focuses on proteases and their inhibitors in humans, with particular emphasis on the caspases of the apoptotic cell death pathway.

His PhD in biochemistry is from the University of Cambridge, studying under Alan Barrett (1981). His first posts were at the Strangeways Research Laboratory and MRC Laboratory of Molecular Biology in Cambridge. In 1985, Salvesen moved to the USA, taking up a position at the University of Georgia. He joined the faculty of Duke University in 1987, and moved his laboratory to the Sanford-Burnham Institute for Medical Research, La Jolla, California in 1996.

As of 2007, Salvesen is the Program Director in Apoptosis and Cell Death Research at the Sanford-Burnham Institute. He also holds an Assistant Professorship at Duke University.

He served as the Vice-Chair (the Americas) of the Biochemical Journal.

== Key recent publications ==
- Pop C, Timmer J, Sperandio S, Salvesen GS. (2006) The apoptosome activates caspase-9 by dimerization. Mol Cell 22: 269–275
- Eckelman BP, Salvesen GS. (2006) The human anti-apoptotic proteins cIAP1 and cIAP2 bind but do not inhibit caspases. J Biol Chem 281: 3254–3260
- Pop C, Salvesen GS. (2005) The nematode death machine in 3D. Cell 123: 192–193
- Scott FL, Denault JB, Riedl SJ, Shin H, Renatus M, Salvesen GS. (2005) XIAP inhibits caspase-3 and -7 using two binding sites: evolutionarily conserved mechanism of IAPs. EMBO J 24: 645–655
- Drag, M., Mikolajczyk, J., Krishnakumar, I. M., Huang, Z. and Salvesen, G. S. (2008) Activity profiling of human deSUMOylating enzymes (SENPs) with synthetic substrates suggests an unexpected specificity of two newly characterized members of the family. Biochem J 409, 461-469
- Riedl, S. J. and Salvesen, G. S. (2007) The apoptosome: signalling platform of cell death. Nat Rev Mol Cell Biol 5, 405-413
- Mikolajczyk, J., Drag, M., Bekes, M., Cao, J. T., Ronai, Z. and Salvesen, G. S. (2007) Small Ubiquitin-related Modifier (SUMO)-specific Proteases: Profiling The Specificities And Activities Of Human Senps. J Biol Chem 282, 26217-26224
- Timmer, J. C., Enoksson, M., Wildfang, E., Zhu, W., Igarashi, Y., Denault, J. B., Ma, Y., Dummitt, B., Chang, Y. H., Mast, A. E., Eroshkin, A., Smith, J., Tao, W. A. and Salvesen, G. S. (2007) Profiling constitutive proteolytic events in vivo. Biochem J 407, 41-48
