= Selection and amplification binding assay =

Molecular biology technique

Selection and amplification binding assay (SAAB) is a molecular biology technique typically used to find the DNA binding site for proteins. It was developed by T. Keith Blackwell and Harold M. Weintraub in 1990.

== Method ==
SAAB experimental procedure consists of several steps, depending on the knowledge available about the binding site. A typical SAAB consists of the following steps:

1. Synthesis of template with random sequence in binding site: three situations are possible: (i) when both the binding site and the protein are known and available; (ii) when only a consensus binding site is available and the binding protein is not; and (iii) when the protein is available, but the binding site is unknown. When the binding site is not known, the number of random nucleotide positions in the template must be large.
2. Incubate labeled double stranded template with protein: usually the protein has to be synthesized in a host cell with fusion techniques. Longer incubation time and large quantity are provided in case of an unspecific binding site.
3. Isolate the DNA bound protein by EMSA: the DNA bound protein, migrated in acrylamide gel, is isolated by autoradiography as per an Electrophoretic mobility shift assay (EMSA) protocol.
4. Amplify the bound template by PCR. For positive control, amplify the starting template also; The bound DNA is isolated via gel excision, purified, and amplified using PCR.
5. Label amplified binding site and reselect for binding by EMSA. Precede the binding step at least for 5 times with the amplified labeled DNA sample and fusion protein.
6. Sequence the DNA: After final step of selection and electrophoresis, clone the DNA into a cloning vector and sequence it. Originally Blackwell used Pyro sequencing, which can be replaced by modern techniques.

== Applications ==
=== Quox homeodomain ===
Quox1 is a homeobox gene involved in the regulation of patterns of development (morphogenesis) in animals, fungi and plants and was originally isolated from cDNA library of five week quail embryo. It is the only gene in the hox family that has been found to express in both prosencephalon and mesencephalon involved in the differentiation of the central and peripheral nerve cells. The optimal DNA binding site for Quox1 or its mammalian homologs was identified by SAAB in 2004. The amplified Quox1 DNA fragment obtained from PCR amplification from a human embryo cDNA librarywas digested with EcoRV and XhoI and cloned into the SmaI and XhoI restriction site of the expression vector pGEMEXxBal. The recombinant plasmids were transformed into competent Escherichia coli strain BL21 and Quox1 fusion proteins were isolated by chromatographic techniques.

The radio labeled probe was incubated with 25 pmol of purified Quox1 homeodomain fusion protein in binding buffer for EMSA. The protein bound DNA was detected by autoradiography, and the bands representing protein–DNA complexes were excised from the gel and the eluted DNA were amplified by PCR using primers complementary to the 20 bp nonrandom flanking sequences. After 5 set of the same procedure, the purified DNA was cloned into pMD 18T and sequenced. Finally the sequence CAATC was identified as the consensus binding sequence for Quox1 homeodomain.

=== Screening ===
By combining the power of random-sequence selection with pooled sequencing, the SAAB imprint assay makes possible simultaneous screening of a large number of binding site mutants. SAAB also allows the identification of sites with high relative binding affinity since the competition is inherent in the protocol. It can also identify site positions that are neutral or specific bases that can interfere with binding, such as a T at - 4 in the E47 half-site. We can apply the technique to less affinity binding sequence also, provided to keep high concentration of binding protein at each step of binding. It is also possible to identify the binding site even if both the protein and sequence is not known.
