= John G. White (biologist) =

Professor Emeritus of Anatomy and Molecular Biology

John White FRS
- Born: John Graham White; 1943 (age 82–83); Wales
- Education: Brunel University (BSc); University of Cambridge (PhD)
- Known for: Research using Caenorhabditis elegans
- Awards: Mullard Award (1994); EMBO Member (1994); Wiley Prize (2026)
- Scientific career
- Fields: Neuroanatomy; Connectomics; Biophotonics; Cell division
- Workplaces: University of Cambridge; University of Wisconsin–Madison; Laboratory of Molecular Biology; National Institute for Medical Research
- Thesis: Computer aided reconstruction of the nervous system of Caenorhabditis elegans (1975)
- Doctoral advisor: Sydney Brenner
- Doctoral students: Richard Durbin
- Other notable students: Julie Ahringer; Tony Hyman
- Website: directory.engr.wisc.edu/bme/faculty/white_john

John Graham White FRS (born 1943) is an Emeritus Professor of Anatomy and Molecular Biology at the University of Wisconsin–Madison. His research interests are in the biology of the model organism Caenorhabditis elegans and laser microscopy.

== Education ==
White was educated at Brunel University, where he was awarded an undergraduate degree in Physics in 1969. He went on to study for his PhD at University of Cambridge in 1975 for work on computer-aided reconstruction of the nervous system of Caenorhabditis elegans supervised by Sydney Brenner.

== Research and career ==
After working at the Laboratory of Molecular Biology, White moved to the University of Wisconsin–Madison in 1993. White's research investigates cell division in the nematode Caenorhabditis elegans. With collaborators Sydney Brenner, John Sulston and others, White co-developed confocal microscopy and mapped the complete nervous system of Caenorhabditis elegans, consisting of 302 neurons and over 7000 synapses. The study was published in 1986 by the Philosophical Transactions of the Royal Society, and is considered to be the first work in the emerging field of connectomes. More recently his research used:

two collaborative but distinct laboratories, one a biological laboratory that investigates cell division in the nematode Caenorhabditis elegans, and the other an interdisciplinary Biophotonics Instrumentation laboratory that develops new computational and optical techniques for live cell studies.

White identified the first gene with a demonstrated role in determining synaptic specificity. He studied the role of cell–cell interaction in determining the lineage pattern, stimulating a wide field of research. In more recent work, White and his co-workers partially confirmed his earlier model of cytokinesis; they discovered genes controlling cytokinesis and found features previously thought specific to plant cell division. Recognising the potentialities of laser-scanning confocal microscopy, White built a prototype microscope: with Brad Amos he developed this into a commercially produced instrument now widely used. His former doctoral students include Richard Durbin, other notable former students include Ahna Skop, Julie Ahringer and Tony Hyman.

=== Awards and honours ===
White was the recipient of the Mullard Award in 1994. He was elected a member of the European Molecular Biology Organization (EMBO) in 1994 and a Fellow of the Royal Society (FRS) in 2005. In 2026 he was awarded the Wiley Prize in Biomedical Sciences.

The Center for Quantitative Cell Imaging at the University of Wisconsin-Madison hosts a biennial seminar series named in honor of John White. Featured speakers have included:

- 2022: Martin Chalfie; Columbia University
- 2018: Cornelia Bargmann; Columbia University

== Personal life ==
White has been professor emeritus since he retired in 2008.
