= William Schafer =

American-British geneticist (born 1964)

William Schafer FRS
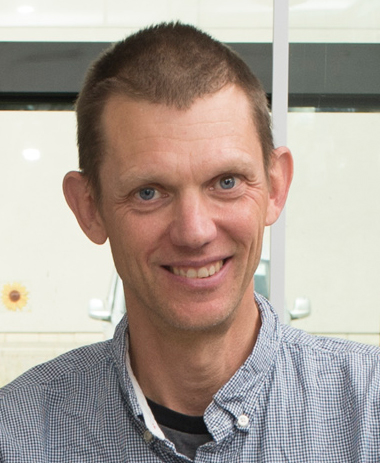
- Born: William Ronald Schafer; August 29, 1964 (age 62); Boston, Massachusetts, United States
- Education: Lakeside High School, DeKalb County, Georgia, United States
- Alma mater: Harvard University (AB Biology, 1986); University of California, Berkeley (PhD Biochemistry, 1991)
- Scientific career
- Thesis: Protein prenylation in saccharomyces cervesiae (1990)
- Doctoral advisor: Jasper Rine
- Website: https://www2.mrc-lmb.cam.ac.uk/group-leaders/n-to-s/william-schafer/

William Ronald Schafer FRS (born August 29, 1964) is an American-British neuroscientist and geneticist who has made important contributions to understanding the molecular and neural basis of behaviour. His work, principally in the nematode C. elegans, has used an interdisciplinary approach to investigate how small groups of neurons generate behavior, and he has pioneered methodological approaches, including optogenetic neuroimaging and automated behavioural phenotyping, that have been widely influential in the broader neuroscience field. He has made significant discoveries on the functional properties of ionotropic receptors in sensory transduction and on the roles of gap junctions and extrasynaptic modulation in neuronal microcircuits. More recently, he has applied theoretical ideas from network science and control theory to investigate the structure and function of simple neuronal connectomes, with the goal of understanding conserved computational principles in larger brains. He is an EMBO member, Fellow of the Academy of Medical Sciences, and Fellow of the Royal Society.

== Career ==
Schafer trained as a geneticist and biochemist at the University of California, Berkeley, under the supervision of Jasper Rine. During his PhD research, he discovered that CAAX-box proteins in yeast, including Ras, are prenylated, and showed that this modification is essential for membrane targeting and biological activity.

As a postdoc in the lab of Cynthia Kenyon, he discovered that dopamine inhibits locomotion in C. elegans and identified the first neuronal calcium channel mutant in a screen for worms with abnormal dopamine sensitivity. In 1995 he became an assistant professor at the University of California, San Diego. In 2001, he was awarded the Presidential Early Career Award for Scientists and Engineers following nomination through the National Institutes of Health.

Following a sabbatical in 2004–2005, in 2006 he moved his research group to the Laboratory of Molecular Biology in Cambridge, UK. In 2020 he was elected a Fellow of the Royal Society

In 2019 he was appointed full professor, part-time, in the Department of Biology at the Katholieke Universiteit Leuven.

== Research ==
Genetically encoded calcium indicators: The first genetically encoded calcium indicators were developed in 1997, but they initially proved difficult to use in transgenic animals. In 2000, Schafer and his student Rex Kerr showed that the GECI yellow cameleon 2 could be used to record activity in muscles and in single neurons of transgenic worms. This was the first use of an optogenetic sensor to record the dynamics of neural activity in an animal. Using this technique, Schafer and his group have characterized the properties of many identified neurons in the worm, including subtypes of mechanosensory, chemosensory and nociceptive neurons, and shown that molecules such as TMCs and TRP channels play conserved sensory functions in these neurons. His group has since shown that the detection of mechanical stimuli by TMC channels, which form the pore of hair cell mechanotransduction channels in humans, relies upon an intracellular ankyrin-CIB complex rather than force transmission through the cell membrane as was once thought.

Automated phenotyping: Schafer's group also pioneered the use of automated imaging and machine vision for behavioral phenotyping. They first used an automated tracking microscope to record C. elegans behaviour over many hours and measure the timing of egg-laying; these experiments showed that worms fluctuate between behavioral states controlled by serotonin. More sophisticated worm trackers were later used to generate high-content phenotypic data for other behaviors such as locomotion; this approach has proven very useful for precisely measuring and classifying effects of genes on the nervous system.

Connectomics and network science: Schafer has also worked with network scientists to investigate the structure of the C. elegans neural connectome. In particular, he recognised that neuromodulatory signaling, being largely extrasynaptic, forms a parallel wireless connectome whose topological features and modes of interaction with the wired connectome could be analyzed as a multiplex network. In 2023, his lab published the first neuropeptidergic connectome of C. elegans, which is the first extrasynaptic connectome of any organism. Together with Laszlo Barabasi's group his group also carried out the first test of the idea that control theory can be used to predict neural function based on the topology of a complex neuronal connectome
