= Gurdon Institute =

UK biology research facility

- Established: 1989
- Director: Benjamin Simons
- Faculty: 17
- Key people: Julie Ahringer; Andrea Brand; John Gurdon; Tony Kouzarides; Benjamin Simons; Emma Rawlins; Daniel St Johnston; Azim Surani
- Formerly called: Wellcome Trust and Cancer Research Campaign Institute of Cancer and Developmental Biology
- Address: Tennis Court Road, Cambridge CB2 1QN
- Location: Cambridge, Cambridgeshire, United Kingdom
- Website: www.gurdon.cam.ac.uk

The Gurdon Institute is a research facility at the University of Cambridge, specialising in developmental biology and cancer biology.

== History ==
The Institute was founded in 1989 to provide a rich, collaborative environment for scientists working in diverse but complementary specialities in the fields of developmental biology and cancer biology. Until 2024 it received its primary funding from the Wellcome Trust and Cancer Research UK.

In 2004 it was renamed in honour of John Gurdon, joint winner of the 2012 Nobel Prize for medicine.

== Faculty ==
There are 13 Group Leaders and 4 Associate Group Leaders.

Group Leaders:

1. Julie Ahringer
2. Sumru Bayin
3. Andrea Brand
4. David Fernandez-Antoran
5. Jenny Gallop
6. John Gurdon
7. Tony Kouzarides
8. Emma Rawlins
9. Benjamin Simons
10. Daniel St Johnston
11. Azim Surani
12. Iva Tchasovnikarova
13. Fengzhu Xiong

Associate Group Leaders:

1. Martin Howard
2. Eric Miska
3. John Perry
4. Steve Jackson

== Alumni ==
Former Group Leaders:

1. Michael Akam
2. Enrique Amaya
3. Nick Brown
4. Rafael Carazo Salas
5. Thomas Down
6. Martin Evans
7. Charles ffrench-Constant
8. Janet Heasman
9. Meritxell Huch
10. Ron Laskey
11. Rick Livesey
12. Hansong Ma
13. Anne McLaren
14. Masanori Mishima
15. Nancy Papalopulu
16. Eugenia Piddini
17. Jonathon Pines
18. Jordan Raff
19. Jim Smith
20. Chris Wylie
21. Philip Zegerman
22. Magdalena Zernicka-Goetz
