= Gillian Griffiths =

British biologist and immunologist

Professor Gillian Griffiths FRS FMedSci
- Born: Gillian Margaret Griffiths
- Education: University College London (BSc); University of Cambridge (PhD)
- Awards: FMedSci; FRS (2013); Buchanan Medal (2019)
- Scientific career
- Fields: Immunology; cell biology
- Workplaces: Cambridge Institute for Medical Research; Laboratory of Molecular Biology
- Thesis: Molecular analysis of the immune response (1983)
- Doctoral advisor: César Milstein
- Website: med.cam.ac.uk/griffiths

Gillian Margaret Griffiths is a British cell biologist and immunologist. Griffiths was one of the first to show that immune cells have specialised mechanisms of secretion, and identified proteins and mechanisms that control cytotoxic T-lymphocyte secretion.

== Current research ==
Griffiths is Professor of Cell Biology and Immunology at the University of Cambridge, running a research laboratory at the Cambridge Institute for Medical Research. She was Director of CIMR from 2013 until 2017.

In 2024, she was appointed as the new Chair of the Department of Cell Biology at Yale School of Medicine, effective 1 April 2025.

== Awards and honours ==
Griffiths is a Fellow at King's College, Cambridge. She was elected a Fellow of the Academy of Medical Sciences in 2005 and Fellow of the Royal Society in 2013.

- 2019: Awarded the Buchanan Medal of the Royal Society.
