= Barry James Thompson =

Australian and British developmental biologist and cancer biologist

- Born: 1978 (age 47–48); Darwin, Australia
- Education: University of Queensland (UQ), University of Cambridge
- Awards: LMB Max Perutz Prize (2003), EMBO Young Investigator Award (2012), Wellcome Trust Investigator Award (2014), EMBL Australia Fellowship (2019).
- Scientific career
- Fields: Developmental biology, Epithelial polarity, Hippo signaling pathway
- Workplaces: John Curtin School of Medical Research; MRC Laboratory of Molecular Biology; European Molecular Biology Laboratory; Francis Crick Institute
- Thesis: The Drosophila gene pygopus encodes a new nuclear component of the Wingless signalling pathway (2004)
- Doctoral advisor: Mariann Bienz
- Other academic advisors: Stephen M Cohen, Barry Dickson
- Website: www.emblaustralia.org/about/our-people/barry-thompson

Barry James Thompson (born 1978) is an Australian and British developmental biologist and cancer biologist. Thompson is known for identifying genes, proteins and mechanisms involved in epithelial polarity, morphogenesis and cell signaling via the Wnt and Hippo signaling pathways, which have key roles in human cancer.

== Early life and education ==
Barry Thompson was born in 1978 into a British-Australian family. He was raised on the Atherton Tableland and in Brisbane in the state of Queensland (Australia). He attended Atherton State Primary School and Brisbane State High School and graduated as school Dux in 1995.

== Scientific career ==
Thompson became interested in developmental biology and the control of tissue growth in 2000 when studying BSc(Hons) at the University of Queensland's Institute for Molecular Biology (IMB) with Professor Michael Waters.

He earned his PhD degree at the MRC Laboratory of Molecular Biology and University of Cambridge (United Kingdom), where he studied the Wnt signaling pathway in Drosophila melanogaster with Dr Mariann Bienz.

He then moved to Germany to work at the European Molecular Biology Laboratory with Prof Stephen M Cohen. There he studied the role of the Hippo signaling pathway during Drosophila development.

In 2007, Thompson was a visiting scientist at the Research Institute of Molecular Pathology in Vienna (Austria), where he worked in the laboratory of Dr Barry Dickson to perform a genome-wide in vivo RNAi screen in Drosophila. In 2008, Thompson established his own laboratory at the Cancer Research UK London Research Institute, which became part of the Francis Crick Institute in 2015. In 2019, Thompson was appointed Professor at the John Curtin School of Medical Research at the Australian National University. His service was terminated in October 2023 due to his actions of sexual harassment.

== Research areas ==
=== Epithelial cell polarity ===
His laboratory works on the molecular mechanisms of epithelial polarity, including both apical-basal polarity and planar cell polarity, using Drosophila melanogaster epithelial tissues as an experimental model system. His laboratory discovered that apical-basal polarisation of the transmembrane protein Crumbs - a key apical determinant - depends upon both a Cdc42-driven positive feedback loop as well as mutual antagonism between apical and basolateral determinants. The Cdc42-driven positive feedback loop involves recruitment of Cdc42 complexes by Crumbs, followed by Cdc42-mediated polarisation of the cytoskeleton, including both actin filaments and microtubules, that allow transport of Crumbs-containing vesicles by the microtubule motor protein Dynein and the actin motor protein Myosin-V. How Cdc42 polarises the cytoskeleton remains an important unsolved problem, but Cdc42 appears to act primarily via activating the kinases aPKC and Pak1 in Drosophila follicle cells.

His laboratory also discovered that planar cell polarisation of the atypical myosin Dachs by the Fat and Dachsous cadherins is responsible for polarising tension at adherens junctions and thus influencing the orientation of cell shapes and cell divisions within the plane of the epithelium. His lab subsequently found that this involved recruitment of the ubiquitin ligase FbxL7 to Fat, in order to degrade Dachs on one side of the cell, such that Dachs binds to Dachsous on the opposite side of the cell.

=== Epithelial cell division and spindle orientation ===
Thompson's laboratory found that cell divisions in epithelia can also be oriented by mechanical forces arising from adjacent tissues growing at different rates. In order for the mitotic spindle to orient in response to planar forces, highly columnar pseudostratified epithelial cells must round up at mitosis in a process that involves the Aurora A and B kinases, activation of Rho-mediated actomyosin contractility, remodelling of adherens junctions, and removal of the Lgl protein from the plasma membrane to allow spindle orienting factors to interact with Dlg/Scrib proteins and thereby align the spindle within the plane of the epithelium.

=== Epithelial morphogenesis ===
While epithelial cell polarity and cell proliferation are fundamental to the construction of an epithelium, and can influence the form of the entire tissue, epithelial morphogenesis also depends fundamentally on anchorage to the extracellular matrix (ECM). Thompson's lab showed that synthesis and enzymatic remodelling of the ECM were crucial to the shaping of Drosophila melanogaster tissues, particularly for formation of the adult fly wings, legs and halteres during metamorphosis.

=== Hippo signaling ===
Thompson's lab discovered several components of the Hippo signaling pathway in Drosophila melanogaster (including Kibra, Spectrins, Mask) and that this pathway functions to sense mechanical strain during development of epithelial cells in vivo, as well as to sense nutritional status via the hormonal Insulin/IGF-1 and PI3K-Akt pathway, in order to control cell proliferation, cellular morphology, and invasive cell migration. His lab has also had a major interest in the role of the Hippo pathway in mammals, including humans, where (unlike Drosophila) the pathway also responds to input from Integrin-Src family kinase signals to enable the mechanical control of epithelial cell proliferation and tissue regeneration, .
