= Felix Armin Randow =

German molecular immunologist

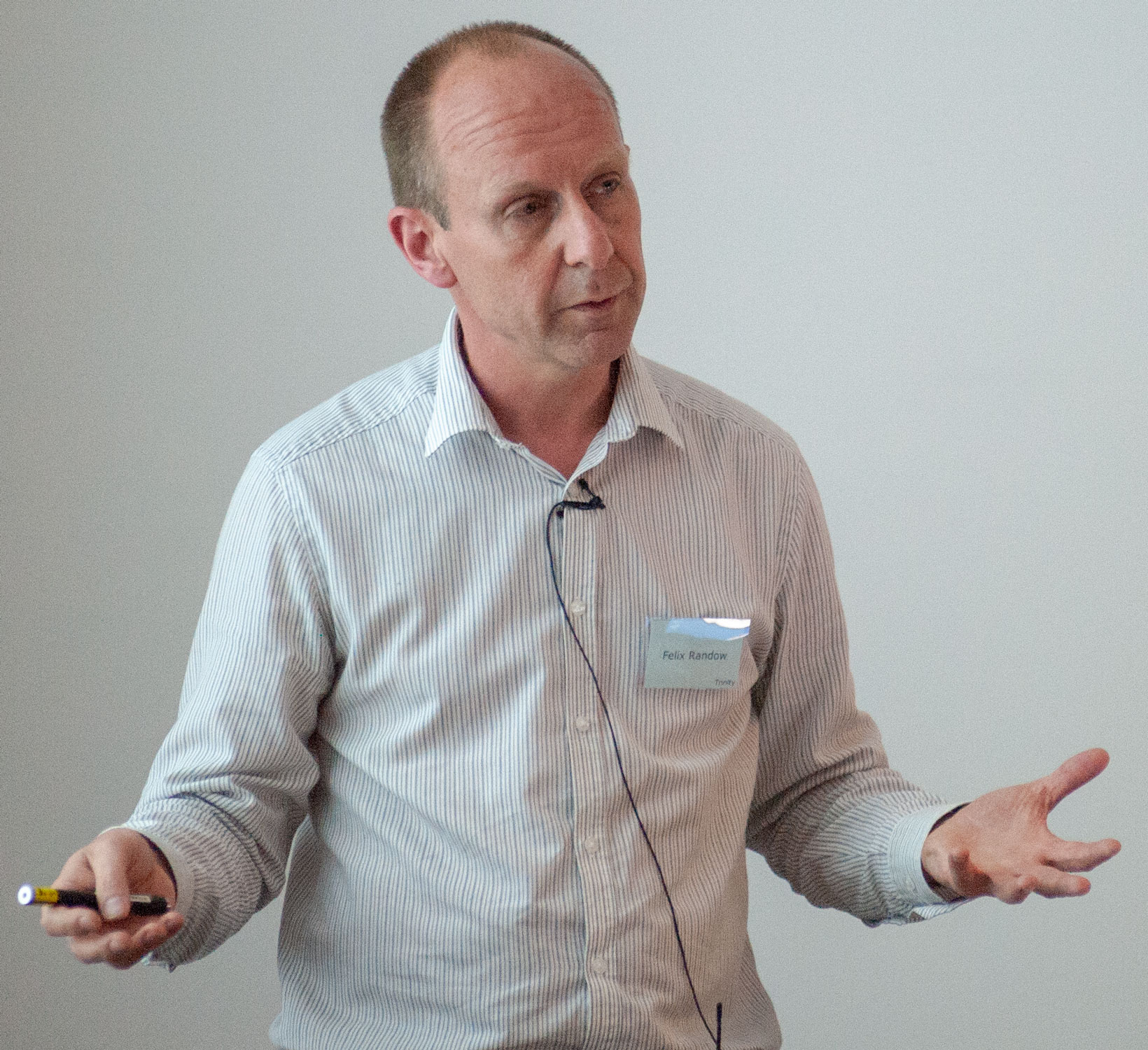
- Education: Goetheschule in Pritzwalk
- Alma mater: Humbold-University in Berlin
- Website: https://www2.mrc-lmb.cam.ac.uk/group-leaders/n-to-s/felix-randow/

Felix Armin Randow is a German molecular immunologist and tenured group leader at the MRC Laboratory of Molecular Biology in Cambridge. Guided by the importance of cell-autonomous immunity as the sole defender of unicellular organisms, Randow has made contributions to the understanding of host-pathogen interactions. He is an EMBO member, a Wellcome Trust investigator and a Fellow of the Academy of Medical Sciences.

== Education ==
Randow grew up in Germany, where he was educated at Goetheschule in Pritzwalk and Humbold-University in Berlin. He obtained his PhD (Dr. rer. nat.) in 1997 under the guidance of Hans-Dieter Volk.

== Career and Research ==
Between 1997 and 2002, Randow undertook postdoctoral research in the laboratory of Brian Seed at Harvard Medical School. In 2003, he became group leader at the MRC Laboratory of Molecular Biology in Cambridge. His work revealed novel principles of cell-autonomous immunity in human tissues, namely that human cells activate anti-bacterial autophagy when sensing endomembrane damage and that cells convert cytosol-invading bacteria into antibacterial signalling platforms by coating the bacterial surface with specific host proteins.

Randow's work has provided important insights into the mechanism of antibacterial autophagy. His group discovered a new pathway of cell-autonomous defence relying on galectin-8 as the receptor for membrane damage caused by cytosol-invading bacteria, NDP52 as the first anti-bacterial autophagy receptor, and TBK1 as specifying the sites of anti-bacterial autophagy. Because the galectin-8 pathway detects membrane damage rather than the invading pathogen per se, its importance likely reaches well beyond anti-bacterial defence, including protection against viruses and tauopathies. More recently, Randow and colleagues showed that stressed but otherwise intact phagosome membranes expose sphingomyelin on their cytosolic surface, providing an early indicator of impending membrane rupture and pathogen release. TECPR1 detects this sphingomyelin exposure and functions as the receptor subunit of a multi-subunit E3 ligase that conjugates mammalian ATG8 proteins onto single membranes, a process termed conjugation of ATG8s to single membranes (CASM). This modification is proposed to mark membranes for specialized cellular responses, including membrane repair or accelerated lysosomal fusion to eliminate microbial contents.

Randow's discovery of the E3 ubiquitin ligase LUBAC attaching M1-linked ubiquitin chains directly onto cytosol-invading bacteria, thereby activating NF-κB and autophagy, revealed another novel concept of cell-autonomous immunity, namely that cells transform bacteria into pro-inflammatory and anti-bacterial signalling platforms by coating their surface with ubiquitin. His demonstration of guanylate-binding proteins (GBPs) encapsulating cytosolic bacteria, thereby preventing the infection of neighbouring cells, revealed that host cells generate a distinct variety of polyvalent protein coats on cytosolic bacteria as a means to antagonize bacteria and strengthen the host defence.

Randow and colleagues recently discovered that the E3 ubiquitin ligase RNF213 catalyses the ubiquitylation of bacterial lipopolysaccharide (LPS) during bacterial infections. LPS ubiquitylation represents the first reported example of non-protein ubiquitylation, a finding that expanded the conceptual boundaries of the ubiquitin system. RNF213 is the founding member of a previously unrecognized class of E3 ubiquitin ligases, termed the RZ family, which are mechanistically distinct from canonical RING, HECT, and RBR E3 ligases.

== Awards ==
- 2018 Member, European Molecular Biology Organisation (EMBO)
- 2019 Fellow, Academy of Medical Sciences
