= Julie Ahringer =

American geneticist

Julie Ahringer FMedSci FRS
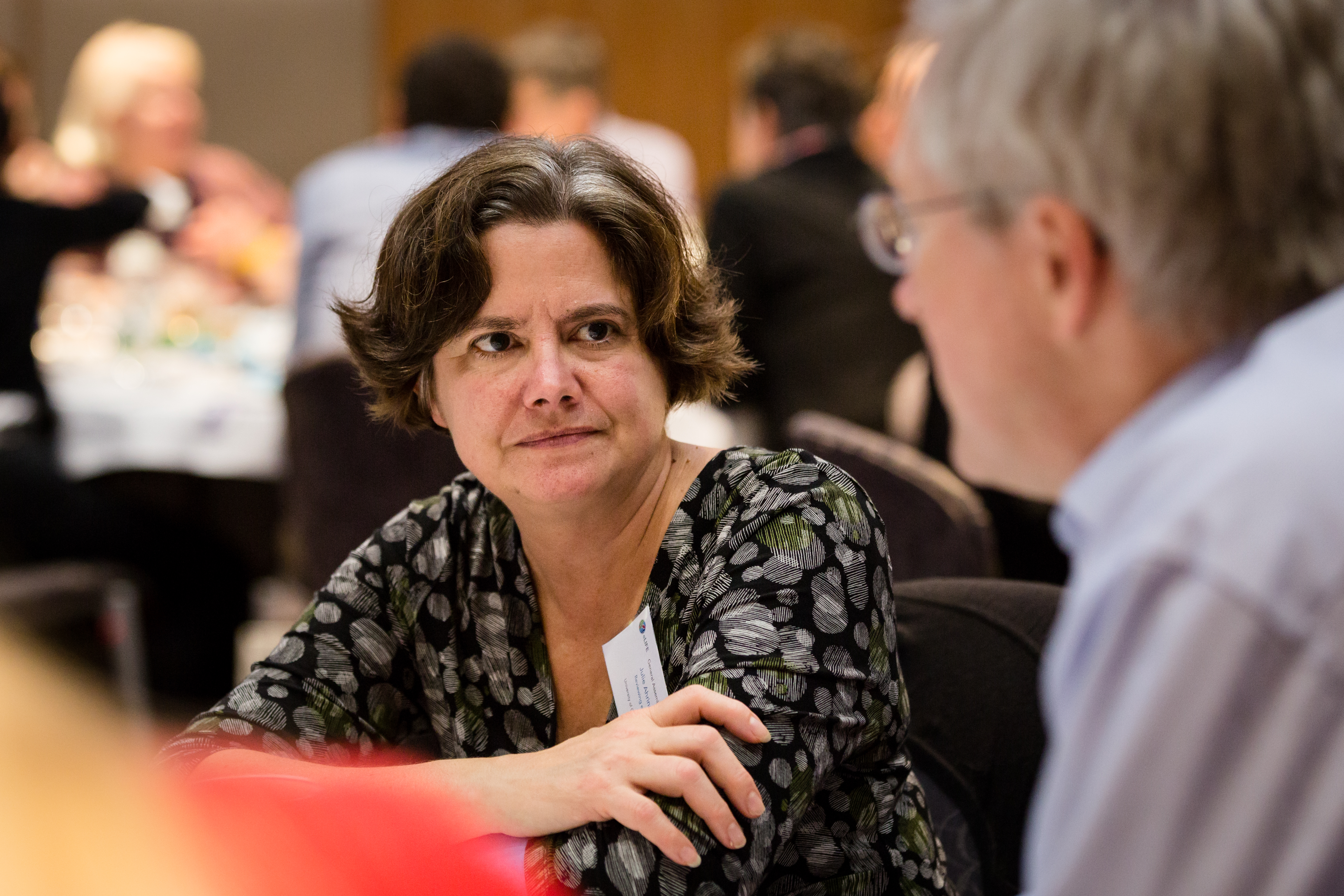
- Ahringer in 2014
- Born: Julie Ann Ahringer
- Education: Lafayette College (BA); University of Wisconsin–Madison (PhD)
- Known for: RNA interference Caenorhabditis elegans
- Spouse: Richard Durbin (m. 1996)
- Awards: EMBO Member (2003); Crick Lecture (2004); George W. Beadle Award (2020)
- Scientific career
- Fields: Chromatin; Epigenetics; Gene expression; Genome organization
- Workplaces: Gurdon Institute; University of Cambridge; Laboratory of Molecular Biology; University of Wisconsin–Madison
- Thesis: Post-transcriptional regulation of fem-3, a sex-determining gene of Caenorhabditis elegans (1991)
- Doctoral advisor: Judith Kimble
- Other academic advisors: John Graham White
- Website: www.gurdon.cam.ac.uk/ahringer.html

Julie Ann Ahringer FMedSci FRS is an American/British Professor of Genetics and Genomics, Director of the Gurdon Institute and a member of the Department of Genetics at the University of Cambridge. She leads a research lab investigating the control of gene expression.

Her laboratory carried out the first systematic inactivation of the majority of genes in an animal through constructing and screening a genome-wide RNA interference library for the nematode worm Caenorhabditis elegans. Research in Ahringer's lab investigates the control of gene expression and genome architecture in development, using C. elegans as a model system.

== Education ==
Ahringer is from Miami, Florida and was educated at Lafayette College in Easton, Pennsylvania, where she was awarded a Bachelor of Arts degree in Chemistry in 1984. She completed her PhD at the University of Wisconsin–Madison while working with Judith Kimble.

== Research and career ==
After her Phd, she carried out postdoctoral research at the Medical Research Council (MRC) Laboratory of Molecular Biology (LMB) in Cambridge with John Graham White. Ahringer became a group leader in the department of genetics in Cambridge in 1996, before moving to the Gurdon Institute in 1998. Her laboratory carried out the first systematic inactivation of the majority of genes in any animal by constructing and screening a genome-wide RNAi library for Caenorhabditis elegans (C. elegans). Ahringer's research group studies the regulation of chromatin structure and function in gene expression and genome organization using the nematode C. elegans as a model to understand development and disease. The Ahringer Lab research is funded by the Wellcome Trust.

=== Honors and awards ===
Ahringer was elected to the EMBO Membership in 2003 and a Fellow of the Academy of Medical Sciences (FMedSci) in 2007. She delivered the Francis Crick lecture prize of the Royal Society in 2004. In 2020 she was awarded the George W. Beadle Award of the Genetics Society of America for outstanding contributions to genetics. She was elected a Fellow of the Royal Society in 2021.

She serves as a member of the scientific advisory board of the Medical Research Council (MRC) along with many other eminent scientists.

== Personal life ==
Ahringer married Richard Durbin in 1996, with whom she has two children.
