= Benjamin Simons =

British physicist

- Education: University of Cambridge
- Known for: Mesoscopic physics
- Awards: Maxwell Medal and Prize (2001)
- Scientific career
- Fields: Condensed matter theory
- Workplaces: Massachusetts Institute of Technology; University of Cambridge
- Doctoral advisor: J. M. F. Gunn

Benjamin David Simons is a British theoretical physicist, working in the field of theoretical condensed matter physics and in biophysics.

Simons holds the Herchel Smith Chair in Physics at the University of Cambridge Cavendish Laboratory. In 2013 he became head of the Theory of Condensed Matter (TCM) group in the Cavendish Lab. He is also a Group Leader at the Cambridge Stem Cell Institute and the Director of the Gurdon Institute since 2024.

== Honours and awards ==
- 2001 awarded the Maxwell Medal and Prize by Institute of Physics
- 2014 awarded the Franklin Medal and Prize by the Institute of Physics
- 2015 awarded the Gabor Medal by the Royal Society of the United Kingdom
- 2021 elected a Fellow of the Royal Society
- 2021 elected a Fellow of the Academy of Medical Sciences

== Biography ==
Simons has two brothers, Thomas and Joseph. His father is a professor at Oxford University, Professor John P. Simons. He is married and has two children.
