= Jenefer Blackwell =

Parasitologist

- Education: University of Western Australia
- Scientific career
- Workplaces: University of Western Australia; University of Cambridge

Jenefer Blackwell is Emeritus Professor in Genetics and Health at The Kids Research Institute Australia and the University of Western Australia. She studies host susceptibility and resistance to infectious and non-communicable diseases.

== Early life and education ==
Blackwell went to Methodist Ladies' College, Perth, in 1961. She graduated with First-class honours in Zoology from the University of Western Australia in 1969, and her PhD in 1974. Her dissertation, "The structure of the deme in the frog Crinia insignifera Moore," considered intra-specific divergence in the Western Australian frogs.

== Research and career ==
Blackwell moved to the UK in 1975 and worked at the London School of Hygiene & Tropical Medicine for 17 years. She was funded by a Wellcome Trust Senior Fellowship until 1991. In 1991 Blackwell joined the University of Cambridge, where she raised money to develop the Cambridge Institute for Medical Research as the Glaxo Professor of Molecular Parasitology. She chaired the World Health Organization Leishmania Genome Consortium between 1992 and 2003. As part of the Wellcome Trust Case-Control Consortium she discovered that HLA alleles regulating cell-mediated immunity are major genetic risk factors for visceral leishmaniasis, a factor that could be important in genome-based vaccine development. She contributed to several books and review papers on genomics and leishmaniasis.

She returned to University of Western Australia in 2007, where she established a genetics laboratory at The Kids Research Institute Australia. Here she has undertaken genetic and functional studies of otitis media, rare genetic diseases, rheumatic heart disease, congenital infections, metabolic diseases, including in aboriginal populations. She identified genetic risk factors for high BMI, rheumatic heart disease and Type 2 Diabetes amongst aboriginal communities.

== Awards and fellowships ==
1994 - British Society for Parasitology Chris Wright Medal

2000 - Leverhulme Medal (Royal Society)

2000 - Elected Fellow of the Academy of Medical Sciences

2009 - Honorary Doctorate from the University of Khartoum

2015 - Elected Fellow of the Australian Academy of Science

2015 - University of Western Australia Vice Chancellor's Senior Research Award
