= Michael Harvey Hastings =

British neuroscientist

Michael Harvey Hastings FMedSci FRS
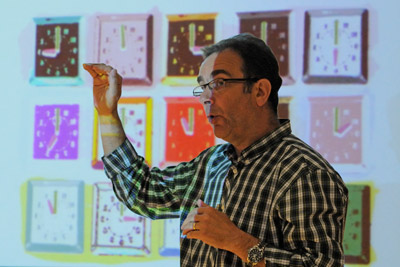
- Education: University of Liverpool, BSc in Marine Biology (1977) and PhD (1980); Victoria University of Manchester, PGCE Technical Education (1981)
- Scientific career
- Fields: Invertebrate marine biology (tidal and lunar rhythms); Seasonal neuroendocrinology (melatonin and pineal gland); Neurochemistry of mammalian circadian behaviour.; Molecular neurobiology of mammalian circadian clocks.
- Workplaces: Department of Anatomy, University of Cambridge (1981 - 2001); MRC Laboratory of Molecular Biology (2001 - )
- Thesis: Aspects of the ecology of sandy shore crustacea
- Doctoral advisor: Ernest Naylor
- Website: www2.mrc-lmb.cam.ac.uk/group-leaders/h-to-m/michael-hastings/

Michael Harvey Hastings is a British neuroscientist who works at the Medical Research Council MRC Laboratory of Molecular Biology (LMB) in Cambridge, UK. Hastings is known for his contributions to the current understanding of biological clocks in mammals and marine invertebrates.

== Background ==
Hastings was admitted to the University of Liverpool to study marine biology (1974) and his PhD was spent at the University’s Port Erin Marine Biological Station on the Isle of Man (1977–80). With a view to becoming a science teacher, he took a Post-graduate Certificate of Education (Technical) at the Victoria University of Manchester, but then elected to pursue a career in biological research. He is married to neuroscientist Angela Charlotte Roberts (University of Cambridge).

== Career and research ==
Hastings’ PhD work introduced him to biological clocks, in the context of tidal and semi-lunar rhythms in the marine isopod crustacean Eurydice pulchra (Leach). With a post-doctoral position in Cambridge (Department of Anatomy, supervisor Joe Herbert) he moved into seasonal time-keeping in mammals with a focus on the role of the pineal gland and its hormone melatonin in photoperiodic regulation of reproduction and metabolism. In 1984 he was appointed to a junior lectureship, receiving tenure in 1988 and a readership in neuroscience in 1998. In this time he developed a research programme into the cellular actions of melatonin in the brain, and the neurochemistry of the central circadian clock, the suprachiasmatic nucleus (SCN) of the hypothalamus. In 2001 he moved to the Division of Neurobiology at the MRC Laboratory of Molecular Biology (Cambridge) as a Group Leader to develop molecular genetic approaches to understanding the SCN molecular clockwork. His recent work has focussed on the genetic basis of cellular circadian time-keeping in mammals, the role of intercellular signalling in synchronising and stabilising the neural circuitry of the SCN, and the role of circadian mechanisms in normal metabolic regulation and its dysregulation in neurodegenerative disease. In October 2013 Hastings joined Michel Goedert as joint head of the Division of Neurobiology, and since May 2015 has been sole Head of Division.

== Awards and honours ==
- 1996 - Mortyn Jones Prize, British Society for Neuroendocrinology
- 2007 - “Aschoff’s Rule”, Gordon Conference on Chronobiology
- 2008 - Elected to Fellowship of the Academy of Medical Sciences
- 2008 - Elected as President of the Society for Research on Biological Rhythm
- 2010 - Elected to Fellowship of the Royal Society
- 2013 - Special Award Lecturer, British Society for Neuroendocrinology
- 2014 - Ellison-Cliffe Lecture Prize and Medal, Royal Society of Medicine
- 2018 - Brenner Lecturer, The Salk Institute
- 2018 - MRC Plenary Lecturer at the Society for Toxicology
