= David Ron =

British biomedical researcher

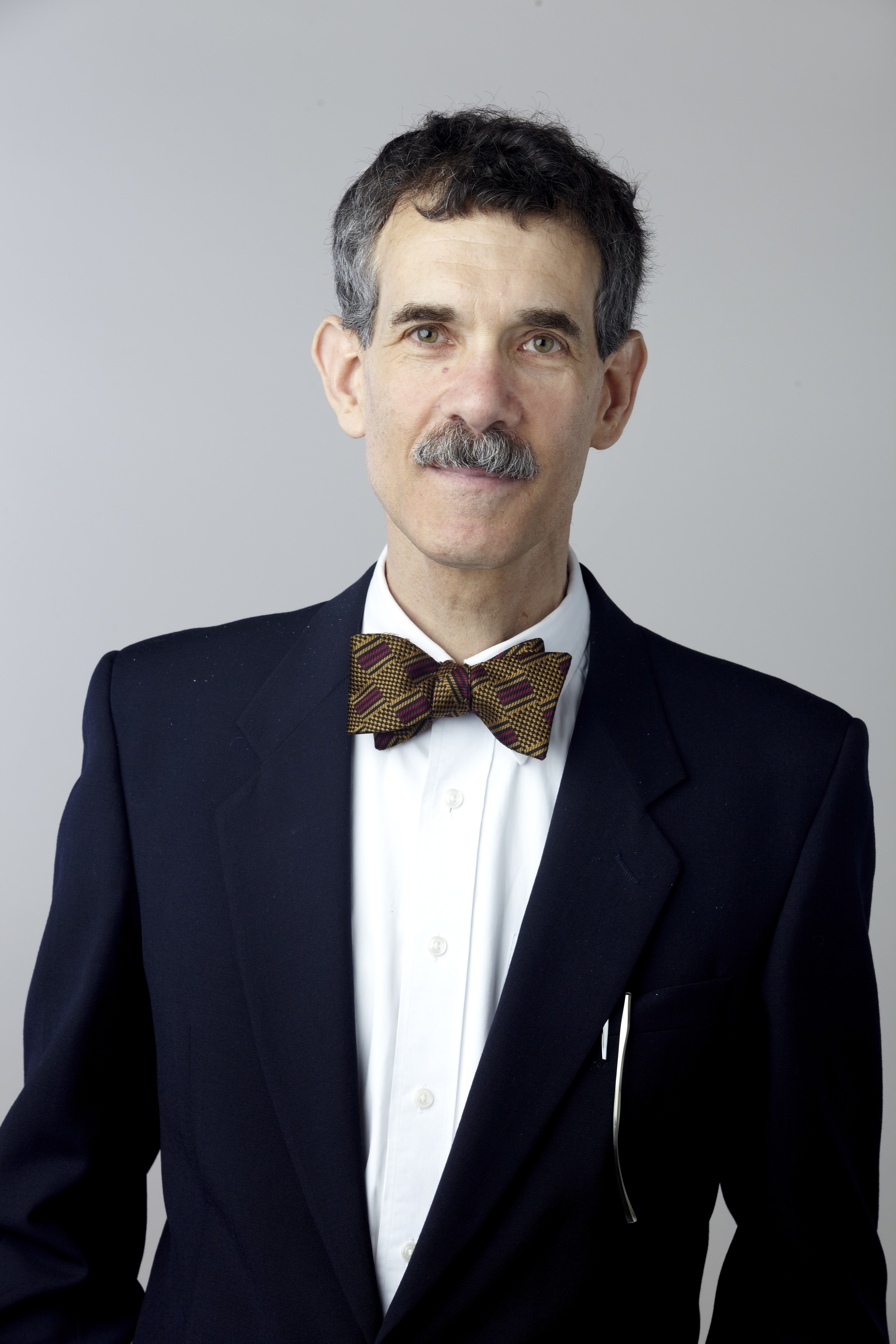
- Portrait via the Royal Society (2014)
- Born: 1955 (age 70–71); Ein Carmel, Israel
- Education: Technion – Israel Institute of Technology
- Spouse: Anne Crozat
- Children: Thomas Ron
- Awards: FRS (2014); FMedSci (2013)
- Scientific career
- Fields: Protein folding; Metabolic disorders
- Workplaces: University of Cambridge; Churchill College, Cambridge; NYU Langone Medical Center
- Academic advisors: Joel F. Habener
- Website: ron.cimr.cam.ac.uk

David Ron (דוד רון) FRS is an Israeli-born British biomedical researcher. He is Professor of Cellular Pathophysiology and Clinical Biochemistry at the University of Cambridge. He was elected to the Royal Society in 2014.

== Biography and family ==
David Ron's parents, Arza Ron (ארזה רון) and Amiram Ron (עמירם רון), were professors of chemistry and physics at the Technion. His younger sister, Dana Ron Goldreich, is a computer scientist at Tel Aviv University. In 1972, Ron graduated from Municipal High-school III in Nave Sha'anan, Haifa.

== Higher education and career ==
Awarded a medical degree from the Faculty of Medicine, Technion in Haifa, Israel, in 1980, Ron went to medical internship and residency training at Mount Sinai Medical Center, in New York City, and in 1989 completed subspecialty training in Endocrinology at Massachusetts General Hospital in Boston, followed by four years of post-doctoral research training with Joel Habner, a Howard Hughes Medical Institute researcher at Harvard Medical School. From 1992 to 2009 he was a member of the faculty at the Skirball Institute of Biomolecular Medicine of New York University School of Medicine.

In 2010, he moved to the Clinical School of Cambridge University, where he serves as a Wellcome Trust Principal Research Fellow and the Professor of Cellular Pathophysiology and Clinical Biochemistry with a laboratory based at the Cambridge Institute for Medical Research. In 2011 he joined Churchill College as a professorial fellow.

== Research ==
His laboratory researches molecular mechanisms by which eukaryotic cells adapt to the burden of unfolded proteins (stress) in their endoplasmic reticulum by way of the Unfolded Protein Response (UPR). Especially notable is their contribution to understanding how stress promotes changes in protein synthesis through an arm of the UPR known as the Integrated Stress Response (ISR).

== Awards and honours ==
Ron was elected a Pew Scholar in Biomedical Sciences (1993–1997), served as the Edwin B. Astwood Lecturer of the Endocrine Society in 2011, and was elected to the European Molecular Biology Organisation (EMBO) in 2012, the Academy of Medical Sciences in 2013, and the Royal Society in 2014.
