= Jan Löwe =

Director of the Medical Research Council (MRC) Laboratory of Molecular Biology (LMB)

Professor Jan Löwe FRS
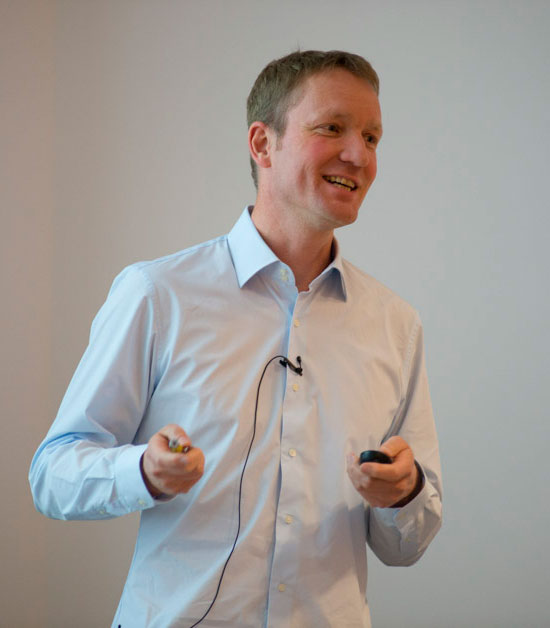

Director of the MRC-LMB
- Incumbent
- Assumed office 2018
- Preceded by: Sir Hugh Pelham

Personal details
- Born: 14 July 1967 (age 59)
- Scientific career
- Education: University of Hamburg (Diplom); Technical University of Munich (Dr. rer. nat.)
- Known for: Structural biology of bacterial cytoskeletons
- Awards: EMBO Member (2004); EMBO Gold Medal (2007)
- Fields: Structural biology; Microbiology; Cell division; DNA segregation; Plasmid partitioning
- Workplaces: Max Planck Institute of Biochemistry; MRC Laboratory of Molecular Biology
- Thesis: Crystal structure of the 20S proteasome from T. acidophilum (1995)
- Doctoral advisor: Robert Huber
- Website: www2.mrc-lmb.cam.ac.uk/groups/jyl

Jan Löwe FRS (born 14 July 1967) is a German molecular and structural biologist and the Director of the Medical Research Council (MRC) Laboratory of Molecular Biology (LMB) in Cambridge, UK. He became Director of the MRC-LMB in April 2018, succeeding Sir Hugh Pelham. Löwe is known for his contributions to the current understanding of bacterial cytoskeletons.

== Education ==
Löwe was awarded a Diploma in Chemistry by the University of Hamburg in 1992. He was then awarded his Dr. rer. nat. in 1995 by the Technical University of Munich, for his thesis work on the structure of the proteasome completed at the Max Planck Institute of Biochemistry under the supervision of Robert Huber.

== Career and research ==
Löwe worked briefly as a postdoctoral researcher at the Max Planck Institute of Biochemistry, before moving to MRC-LMB in 1996 to take up an EMBO long-term fellowship to work on crystallising FtsZ, a bacterial homologue of eukaryotic tubulin, with Linda A. Amos. Löwe became a group leader at MRC-LMB in 1998 and was awarded tenure in 2002. His group has largely worked on the structural and molecular biology of prokaryotic cytoskeletons, but has also made important contributions to the current understanding of cell division and DNA partitioning in both prokaryotes and eukaryotes. Löwe became the Director of MRC-LMB in April 2018, having formerly been Deputy Director (2016–18) and Joint Head of the Structural Studies Division at the institute (2010–18). In 2018, the title of Honorary Professor of Structural and Molecular Microbiology at the University of Cambridge was conferred on him.

=== Awards and honours ===
- 1996 Otto-Hahn Medal of the Max Planck Society
- 2002 Leverhulme Prize for Biochemistry
- 2004 Member, European Molecular Biology Organisation (EMBO)
- 2007 EMBO Gold Medal
- 2008 Elected a Fellow of the Royal Society (FRS)
- 2011 Wellcome Trust Senior Investigator Award
- 2012 Fellow at Darwin College, Cambridge
- 2013 Fellow of the German Academy of Sciences Leopoldina
