= MRC Laboratory of Molecular Biology =

Research institute in Cambridge, England

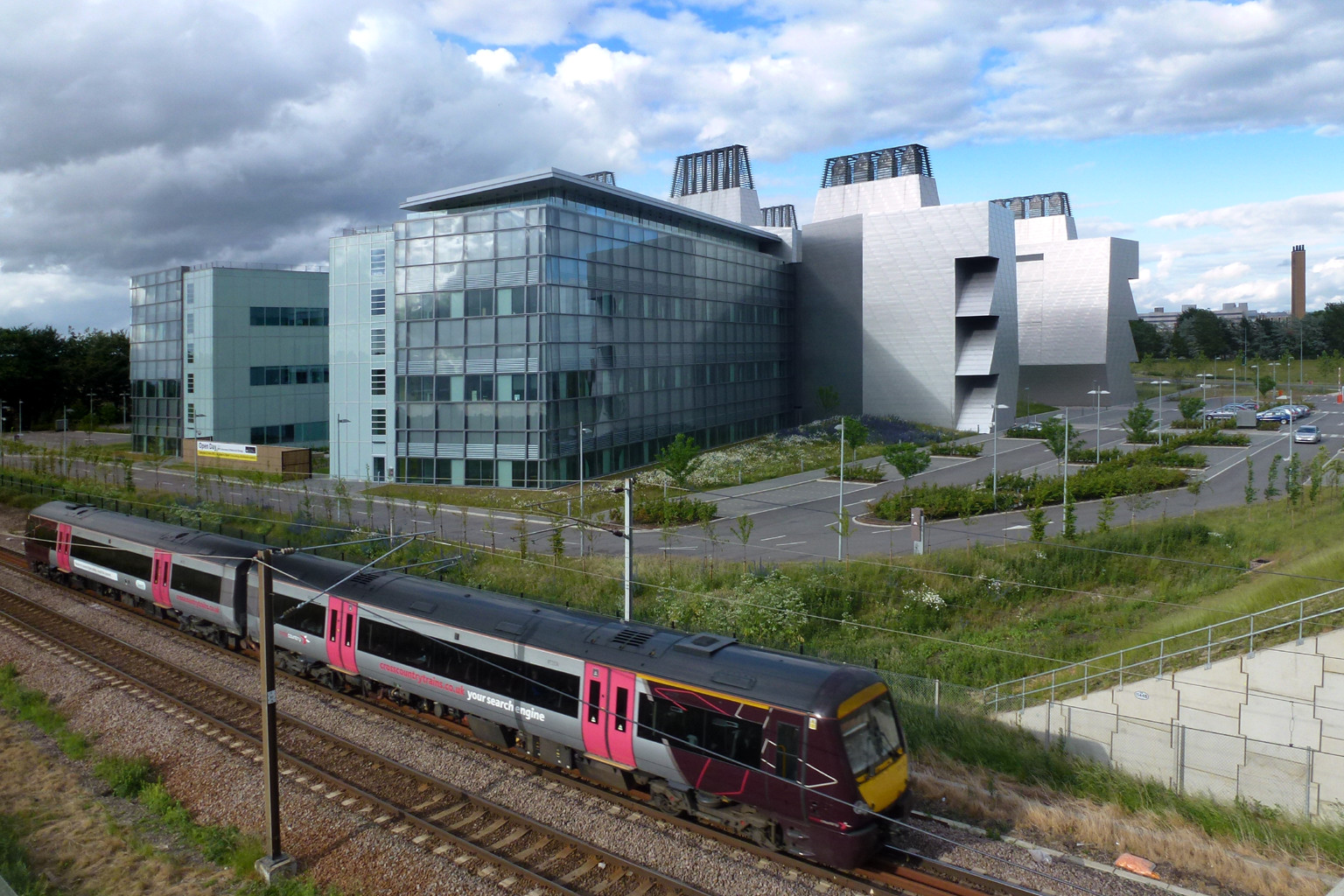
- The new building of the LMB viewed from the Cambridgeshire Guided Busway bridge in June 2013
- Abbreviation: MRC LMB
- Location: Cambridge, UK
- Coordinates: 52.1763°N 0.1430°E
- Fields: Molecular biology
- Director: Jan Löwe
- Parent organization: Medical Research Council
- Website: mrclmb.ac.uk

The Medical Research Council (MRC) Laboratory of Molecular Biology (LMB) is a research institute in Cambridge, England, involved in the revolution in molecular biology which occurred in the 1950–60s. Since then it has remained a major medical research laboratory at the forefront of scientific discovery, dedicated to improving the understanding of key biological processes at atomic, molecular and cellular levels using multidisciplinary methods, with a focus on using this knowledge to address key issues in human health.

A new replacement building constructed close by to the original site on the Cambridge Biomedical Campus was opened by Queen Elizabeth II in May 2013. The road outside the new building is named Francis Crick Avenue after the 1962 joint Nobel Prize winner and LMB alumnus, who co-discovered the helical structure of DNA in 1953.

== History ==
=== Origins: 1947-61 ===
Max Perutz, following undergraduate training in organic chemistry, left Austria in 1936 and came to the University of Cambridge to study for a PhD, joining the X-ray crystallographic group led by J.D. Bernal. Here, in the Cavendish laboratory, he started his lifelong work on hemoglobin. The death of Lord Rutherford led to his successor, Lawrence Bragg, a pioneer in X-ray crystallography, becoming the new Cavendish professor of physics in 1938. Bragg became a major supporter of Perutz and his group in those early days.

After World War II, many scientists from the physical side of science turned to biology, bringing with them a new way of thinking and expertise. John Kendrew joined Perutz's group to study a protein closely related to hemoglobin — myoglobin — in 1946. In 1947, the Medical Research Council (MRC), under the guidance of its Secretary Edward Mellanby, decided to form and support the "MRC Unit for the Study of the Molecular Structure of Biological Systems". The group, which by 1948 also included Hugh Huxley working on muscle, was joined in 1949 by Francis Crick, who worked initially on protein crystallography. In 1951 they were joined by James Watson.

1953 was an annus mirabilis: Watson and Crick discovered the double-helical structure of DNA, which revealed that biological information was encoded in a linear structure and how this information could be duplicated during cell division. Perutz discovered that the detailed three-dimensional structures of proteins, such as myoglobin and hemoglobin could, in principle, be solved by X-ray analysis using a heavy metal atom labeling technique. Hugh Huxley discovered that muscle contraction works by a sliding filament mechanism.

In 1957 the group's name was changed to the "MRC Unit for Molecular Biology". Also that year, Vernon Ingram discovered that the disease sickle cell anaemia is caused by a single amino acid change in the hemoglobin molecule and Sydney Brenner joined the Unit. In 1958, Crick's review "On Protein Synthesis" appeared: this laid out, for the first time, the central dogma of molecular biology, the sequence hypothesis and the adaptor hypothesis. In 1961 Brenner helped discover messenger RNA and, in the same year, he and Crick established that the genetic code was read in triplets.

All this work was accomplished in a single-storey temporary building (The Hut), a few rooms in the Austin Wing, a room with a lean-to glass front (The Greenhouse) and a short sealed off corridor (The Gallery) within the Cavendish laboratory.

=== Opening of the LMB in 1962 ===
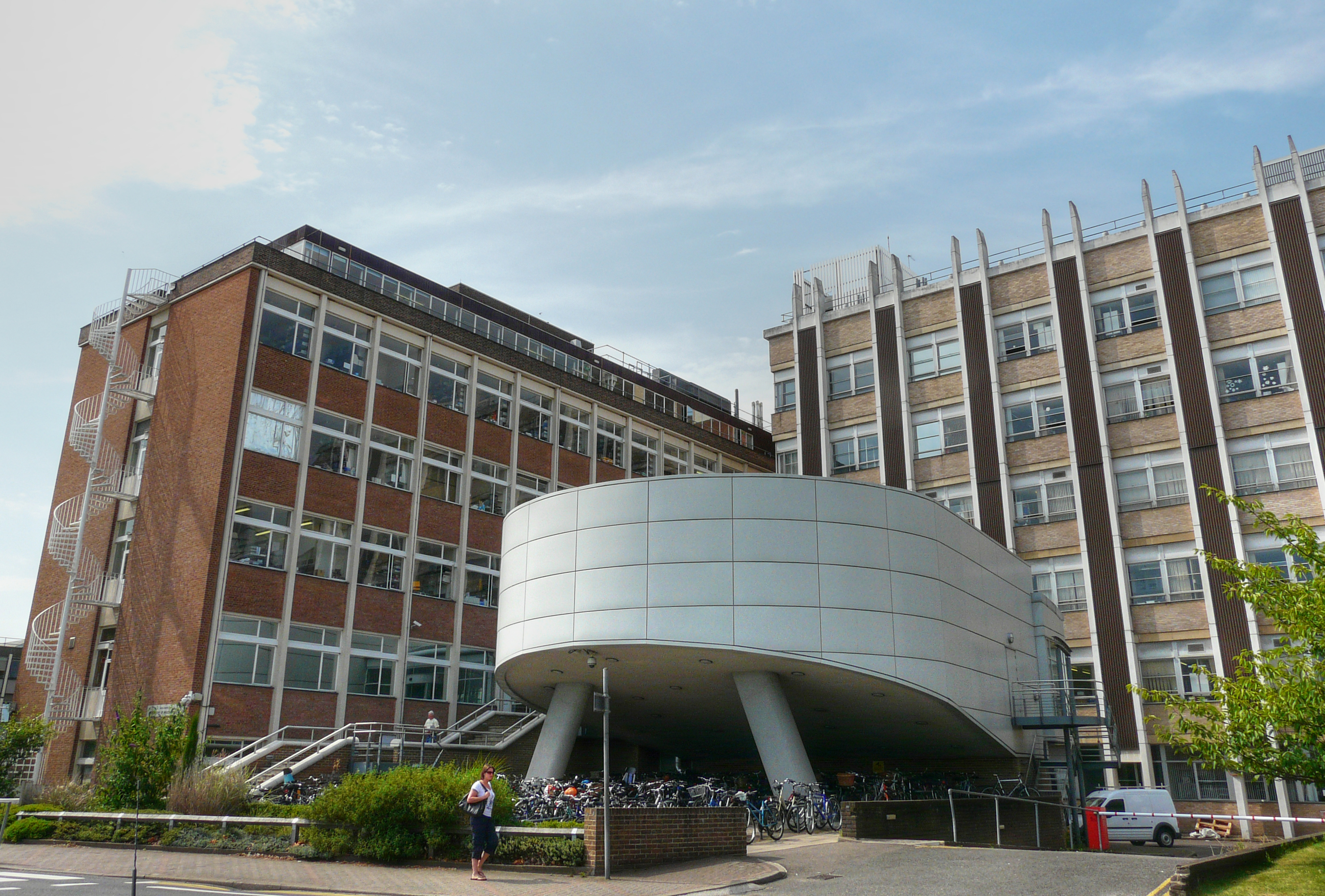
The LMB building until 2012. The white structure is a new lecture hall added to the old building.

The MRC built a new Laboratory on the outskirts of Cambridge — the LMB — into which the Unit from the Cavendish moved in early 1962. Additionally, Fred Sanger's Unit which had been housed in the university's Biochemistry department joined them, as did Aaron Klug from London. Sanger had invented methods for determining the sequence of amino acids in a protein: he was awarded the Nobel Prize in Chemistry in 1958 for the first protein sequence, that of insulin. The new laboratory was opened by Queen Elizabeth II in 1962. Later that year, Kendrew and Perutz shared the Nobel Prize for Chemistry and Crick and Watson received a share of the Nobel Prize for Physiology or Medicine. The LMB building was incorporated into the new Addenbrooke's Hospital complex as this was constructed in the 1970s.

The new LMB had Perutz as its chairman and contained 3 divisions:

- Structural Studies, headed by Kendrew.
- Molecular Genetics (Crick).
- Protein Chemistry (Sanger).

In all, there were about 40 scientists but this number rapidly increased, particularly with a large influx of post-doctoral visitors from the US.

=== Molecular Biology: after 1962 ===
During the 1960s, molecular biology the world over flourished, the outline bones of the 1950s now having flesh put on them. The detailed 3-D atomic structures of a series of proteins, and how they function, were deduced. These included myoglobin, hemoglobin and chymotrypsin, the last by David Blow. The genetic code, from evidence around the world, was assembled by Crick. Punctuation signals in the messenger RNA — where to start translating the RNA into a protein sequence, and where to stop — were discovered by postdoctoral fellow Joan A. Steitz. Crick suggested how the tRNA molecules — his original adaptors — read the messenger in his wobble hypothesis. Sanger devised new methods for sequencing RNA molecules and then later for DNA molecules (for which he received a second Nobel Prize in Chemistry in 1980). Much later, this line was extended to include determining the sequence of whole genomes, in which John Sulston played a key role. How tRNA precursor molecules are processed to give a functional tRNA was elucidated by John Smith and Sid Altman, and this later led to the discovery of ribozymes. The atomic structure of the first tRNA molecule was solved and zinc fingers discovered by Klug (who received the Nobel Prize for Chemistry in 1982). The structure of the ATP synthase was solved by John E. Walker and Andrew Leslie, for which Walker shared the Nobel Prize for Chemistry in 1997. In 1990, Kiyoshi Nagai began working on deciphering the structure of the spliceosome, first using X-ray crystallography and later with cryogenic electron microscopy, and in 2016 his group published the first structure of the spliceosome captured in a fully active, substrate-bound state immediately following catalytic reaction. The structure of the ribosome was solved by Venkatraman Ramakrishnan, for which he shared the Nobel Prize for Chemistry in 2009.

=== 1960s: Development and C. elegans ===
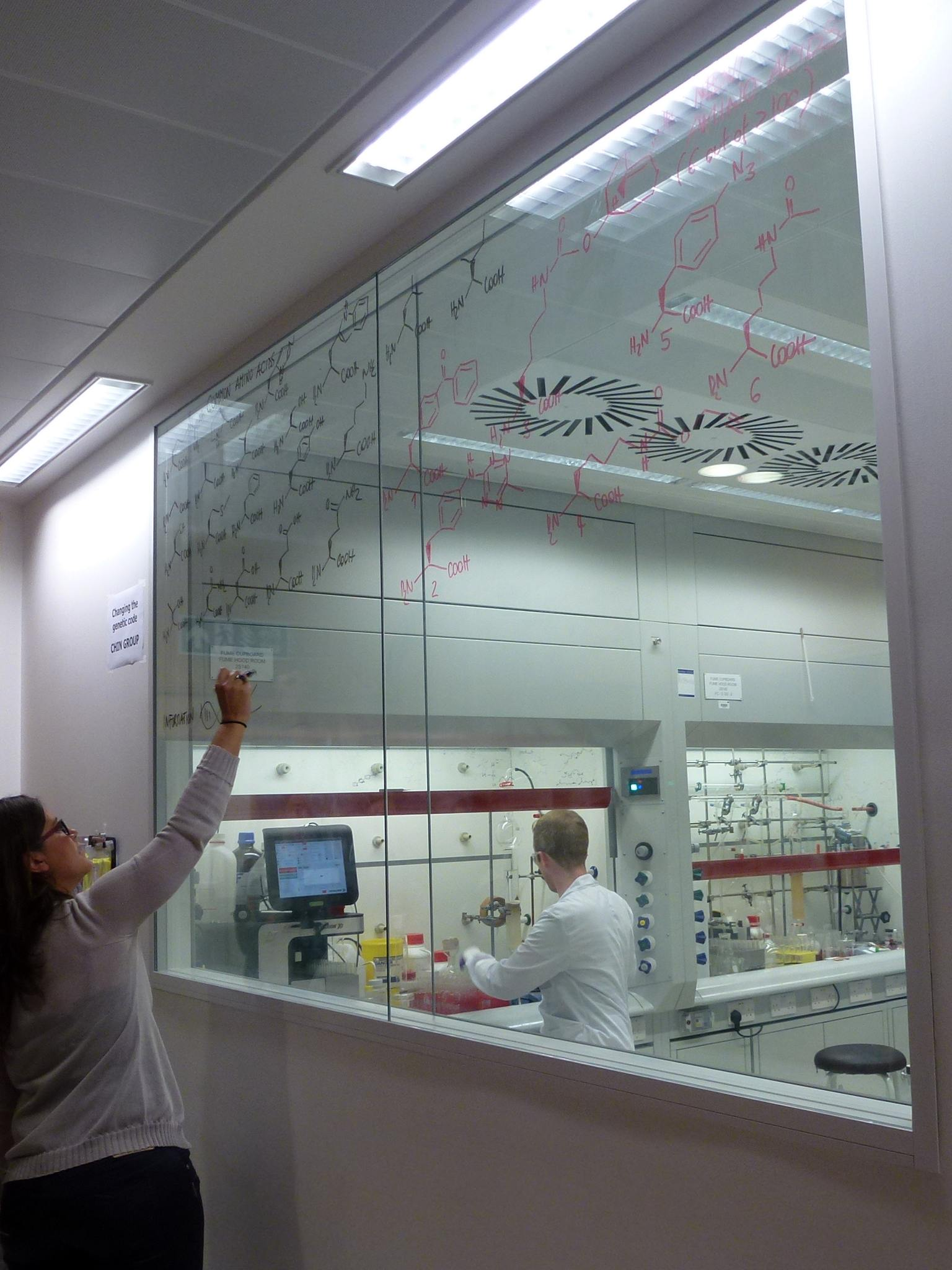
A laboratory at the new LMB building in June 2013

Towards the end of the 1960s decade, it seemed that new problems in biology could be solved using the approaches which proved so successful in molecular biology.

Sydney Brenner started working on the genetics of the nematode C. elegans in 1965. This group expanded, especially with many foreign visitors who today form the core of C. elegans research. Sulston determined the cell lineage of this small worm and John Graham White the entire wiring diagram of its nervous system. Robert Horvitz, who helped in the cell lineage, was to share the Nobel Prize for Physiology or Medicine with Brenner and Sulston in 2002. Jonathan Hodgkin established the genetic pathway in C. elegans which controls sex determination. John Gurdon developed the use of the frog oocyte to translate mRNAs, sharing the 2012 Nobel Prize for Physiology or Medicine for his earlier work showing that genetic information remains intact during development.

Peter Lawrence came to study pattern formation, helping discover how compartments in Drosophila determine the fly's body plan. Under his influence, Crick also became interested in morphogenetic gradients and how they may help specify biological patterns.

=== Immunology ===
César Milstein had over many years been working on antibody variation. He was joined in this by Georges Köhler and, together, they discovered how to produce monoclonal antibodies. For this they shared the Nobel Prize for Physiology or Medicine in 1984. This area was extended by Greg Winter who pioneered antibody engineering using phage display to make novel human antibodies and antibody fragments, for which he shared the Nobel Prize in Chemistry in 2018. Both monoclonal antibodies and their fragments are now of major medical importance.

Michael Neuberger discovered the mechanism by which antibody diversification occurs by Activation-induced (cytidine) deaminase. This fundamental discovery is the keystone to understanding the molecular mechanism by which organisms can produce a diverse repertoire of antibodies to recognise new pathogens. This is of wider importance in understanding the role of directed mutagenesis and DNA repair in physiology. Finally, the molecular mechanisms elucidated by Neuberger may be of great importance in understanding the mutational pattern of kataegis in breast cancer. Sadly, Michael Neuberger died from myeloma – the irony of which was not lost on him.

=== Cell biology ===
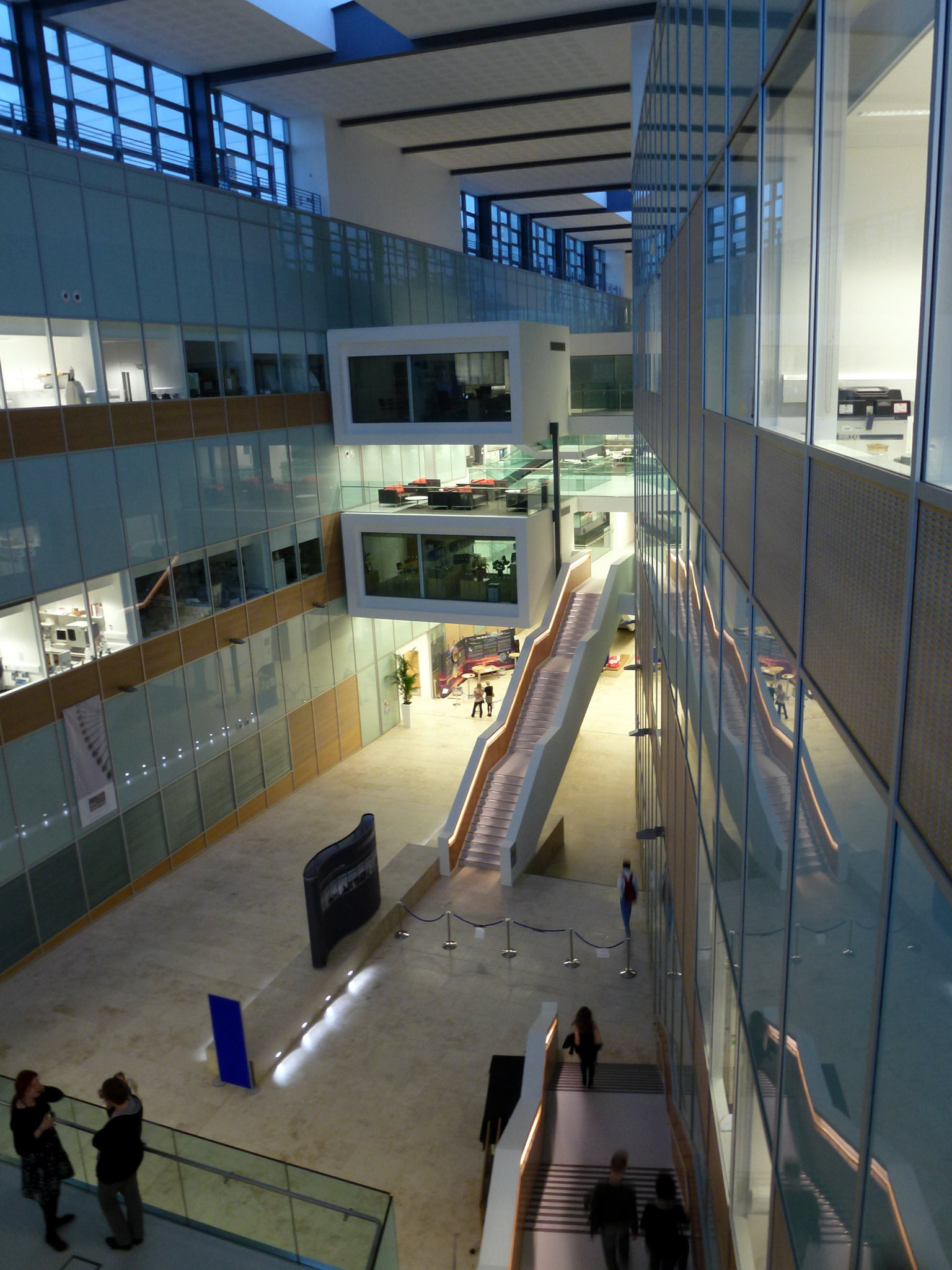
Atrium of the new building at night

The emphasis on classical molecular biology shifted towards cell biology and development, so that the Molecular Genetics division was renamed Cell Biology. Mark Bretscher discovered the topological way proteins are arranged in the human erythrocyte membrane and its phospholipid asymmetry. Richard Henderson and Nigel Unwin developed electron crystallography to determine the structure of two-dimensional arrays, applying this to the bacterial purple protein, bacteriorhodopsin. Barbara Pearse discovered the major components of clathrin-coated vesicles, structures formed during endocytosis, and a low resolution structure of the cage-like lattice around them was determined. How proteins become localised to different parts of the cell — such as to the endoplasmic reticulum, Golgi apparatus or the plasma membrane — and the role of this in cell polarity, have been elucidated by Bretscher, Hugh Pelham and Sean Munro. The spindle pole bodies — the large structures in yeast cells which act as the foci to which chromosomes are moved during mitosis — have been purified and a low resolution structure of them deduced by John Kilmartin.

A continuing interest has been the structure of chromosomes. This was initiated by a visitor, Roger Kornberg, who discovered the first level of condensation of DNA, the nucleosome, and continues with the focus on understanding the higher orders of folding DNA.

=== Neurobiology ===
A new division of Neurobiology was created in 1993 with a wide variety of topics. Nigel Unwin has further developed electron crystallography and solved the structure of the acetylcholine receptor, which activates many neurons. Michel Goedert has identified variant proteins associated with Alzheimer's disease.

=== Instrumentation ===
Scientific advances often depend on technological advances: the LMB has been at the forefront of many of these. Some major examples include nucleic acid sequencing, protein and antibody engineering, construction of new X-ray equipment and the invention of the scanning confocal microscope.

== Administrative structure ==
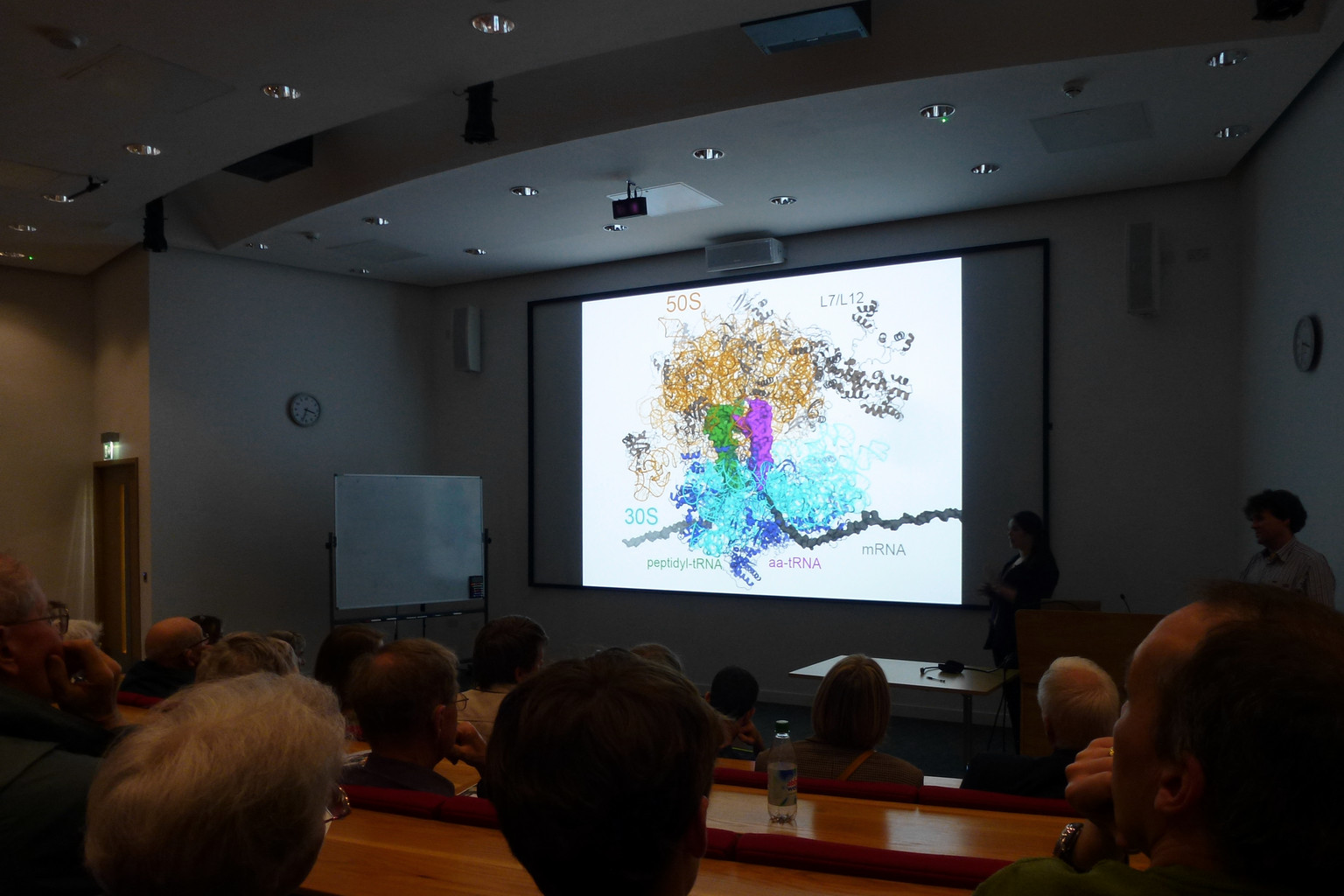
A public lecture at the new building

The LMB has a deliberately simple administrative environment. From outside the LMB, the parent MRC ensured that the quinquennial assessment had a light touch: only a brief explanation of past achievements and an indication of where future plans lay were required by the external committee. Their recommendations were simply advisory, leaving the division leaders a free hand as to how to run their affairs: they were assumed to know best.

Within the LMB, Perutz's criterion of how to arrange things was that the act of doing science should be facilitated at all levels. The LMB had a single budget: there were no personal budgets or equipment — everything was communal. It had state-of-the-art equipment and was well financed by the MRC. Chemical reagents, glassware and other expendables could be withdrawn from a single store with only a signature required. Key to the smooth functioning of the lab was Michael Fuller, who was responsible for its day-to-day running.

There was no overt hierarchy; everyone was on first-name terms. Most members of the lab met freely in the canteen, which was said to assist inter-divisional communication and collaboration. Today the LMB has around 450 scientists, of whom 130 are postdoctoral researchers and 110 students. The new building (situated on the Cambridge Biomedical Campus) was opened in 2013 and has four seminar rooms named after LMB scientists: Sydney Brenner, Aaron Klug, César Milstein and Frederick Sanger, as well as a lecture theatre named after the late Max Perutz.

== Groups at the LMB ==
As of 2024 there are around fifty group leaders Groups are part of one of the four divisions of the LMB: Cell Biology, Neurobiology, Protein and Nucleic Acid Chemistry and Structural Studies. Group leaders include the following people:

- Matteo Allegretti
- Radu Aricescu
- Diana Arseni
- David Barford
- Buzz Baum
- Anne Bertolotti
- Tanmay A. M. Bharat
- Simon Bullock
- Albert Cardona
- Andrew Carter
- Jason Chin
- Emmanuel Derivery
- Juliette Fedry
- Michel Goedert
- Joe Greener
- Ingo Greger
- Michael Hastings
- Ramanujan Hegde
- Philipp Holliger
- Leo James
- Gregory Jefferis
- Joergen Kornfeld
- Patrycja Kozik
- Madeline Lancaster
- Roni Levin Konigsberg
- Jan Löwe
- Kate McDole
- Andrew McKenzie
- Harvey McMahon
- Liz Miller
- Sean Munro
- Garib Murshudov
- Kelly Nguyen
- John O'Neill
- Lori Passmore
- Venki Ramakrishnan
- Lalita Ramakrishnan
- Felix Armin Randow
- Jing Ren
- Wes Robertson
- Noe Rodriguez
- Christopher Russo
- Benjamin Ryskeldi-Falcon
- Julian Sale
- William Schafer
- Sjors Scheres
- Marta Shahbazi
- John Sutherland
- Chris Tate
- Marco Tripodi
- Sven Truckenbrodt
- Ana Tufegdžić Vidaković
- Roger L. Williams
- Joseph Yeeles
- Suyang Zhang
- Marta Zlatic

=== Emeritus ===
The LMB is also home to a number of Emeritus Scientists, pursuing their research interests in the Laboratory after their formal retirement including:

- Brad Amos
- Mariann Bienz
- Richard Anthony Crowther
- Philip Richard Evans
- Alan Fersht
- Michael Gait
- Richard Henderson
- Rob Kay
- John Kendrick-Jones
- John Kilmartin
- Peter Lawrence
- Andrew Leslie
- David Neuhaus
- Hugh Pelham
- Daniela Rhodes
- Murray Stewart
- Andrew Travers
- Nigel Unwin
- Greg Winter

== Notable people ==
=== Nobel recipients ===
Scientific staff of the LMB who have been awarded individually or have shared Nobel Prizes are:

- Frederick Sanger 1958 & 1980 (1980 was shared with Paul Berg and Walter Gilbert)
- John Kendrew 1962 (shared with Max Perutz)
- Max Perutz 1962 (shared with John Kendrew)
- Francis Crick 1962 (shared with Maurice Wilkins and Jim Watson)
- Jim Watson 1962 (shared with Francis Crick and Maurice Wilkins)
- Aaron Klug 1982
- César Milstein 1984 (shared with Georges Köhler and Niels Jerne)
- Georges Köhler 1984 (shared with César Milstein and Niels Jerne)
- John Walker 1997 (shared with Paul D. Boyer and Jens Christian Skou)
- Sydney Brenner 2002 (shared with Robert Horvitz and John Sulston)
- Robert Horvitz 2002 (shared with Sydney Brenner and John Sulston)
- John Sulston 2002 (shared with Sydney Brenner and Robert Horvitz)
- Venkatraman Ramakrishnan 2009 (shared with Thomas A. Steitz and Ada E. Yonath)
- Michael Levitt 2013 (along with Martin Karplus and Arieh Warshel)
- Richard Henderson 2017 (shared with Jacques Dubochet and Joachim Frank)
- Greg Winter 2018 (shared with Frances H. Arnold and George P. Smith)

=== Visitor recipients of Nobel Prizes ===
Visitors who received a Nobel Prize for work done, or initiated at the LMB and alumni include:

- Sid Altman 1989 (shared with Thomas R. Cech)
- Richard J. Roberts 1993 (shared with Phillip Allen Sharp)
- Michael Smith 1993
- Roger Kornberg 2006
- Andrew Fire 2006 (shared with Craig C. Mello)
- Elizabeth Blackburn 2009 (shared with Carol W. Greider and Jack W. Szostak)
- Thomas A. Steitz 2009 (shared with Venkatraman Ramakrishnan and Ada E. Yonath)
- Marty Chalfie 2008 (shared with Osamu Shimomura and Roger Y. Tsien)
- John Gurdon 2012 (shared with Shinya Yamanaka)
- Martin Karplus 2013 (shared with Michael Levitt and Arieh Warshel)
- Arieh Warshel 2013 (shared with Martin Karplus and Michael Levitt)
- Morten Meldal 2022 (shared with Carolyn Bertozzi and K. Barry Sharpless)

=== Notable LMB alumni ===
- Jerry Adams
- David Agard
- Julie Ahringer
- M. Madan Babu
- Leslie Barnett
- Alex Bateman
- David M. Blow
- Andrea Brand
- Steven E. Brenner
- Elizabeth Blackburn
- George Brownlee
- Cyrus Chothia
- Suzanne Cory
- Richard M. Durbin
- Sean Eddy
- Roger Freedman
- Mark Bender Gerstein
- Toby Gibson
- Julian Gough
- Gillian Griffiths
- Richard Harland FRS
- Stephen C. Harrison
- Brian S. Hartley
- Jonathan Hodgkin
- Kenneth Holmes
- Philip Ingham
- Robert Insall
- David Ish-Horowicz
- Cynthia Kenyon
- Judith Kimble
- Maria Leptin
- Arthur M. Lesk
- Harvey Lodish
- Philippa Marrack
- Laura Machesky
- Yanlan Mao
- Andrew McLachlan
- Morten P. Meldal
- Barbara J. Meyer
- Alan Munro
- Kiyoshi Nagai
- Michael Neuberger
- Mary Osborn
- Ketan J. Patel
- Barbara Pearse
- Richard Perham
- Nicholas Proudfoot
- Terence Rabbitts
- Julian Rayner
- Akhilesh Reddy
- Margaret Robinson
- Michael Rossmann
- Gerald M. Rubin
- Guy Salvesen
- Gebhard Schertler
- Tilman Schirmer
- Melina Schuh
- Magdalena Skipper
- Alan Smith
- Peter Karl Sorger
- Eileen Southgate
- James Spudich
- Joan A. Steitz
- Susan S. Taylor
- Sarah Teichmann
- Jean Thomas
- Ashok Venkitaraman
- Alan John Warren
- Harold M. Weintraub
- John Graham White
- Alison Woollard
- Mitsuaki Yoshida
