= William Bradshaw Amos =

British biologist, emeritus scientist (born 1945)

Brad Amos FRS
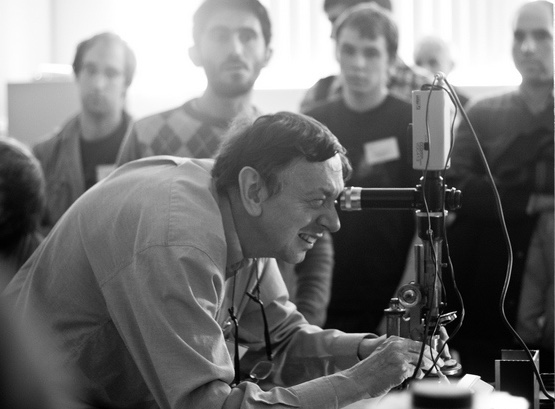
- Amos at the 2010 Plymouth Optical Microscopy course
- Born: William Bradshaw Amos; 21 November 1945 (age 80)
- Education: King Edward VII School, Sheffield; University of Oxford (BA); University of Cambridge (PhD)
- Awards: Mullard Award (1994)
- Scientific career
- Institutions: Laboratory of Molecular Biology; University of Cambridge; Bio-Rad Laboratories
- Thesis: Aspects of contraction in the Peritrich stalk (1975)
- Website: www2.mrc-lmb.cam.ac.uk/group-leaders/emeritus/brad-amos

William Bradshaw Amos FRS (born 1945) is a British biologist, Emeritus Scientist at the Medical Research Council (MRC) Laboratory of Molecular Biology (LMB). He led a team that developed the mesolens, a microscope with a giant lens.

== Education ==
Amos was educated at King Edward VII School, Sheffield and graduated from University of Oxford with a Bachelor of Arts degree in 1966, and from University of Cambridge with a PhD in 1970.

== Career and research ==
Amos was research assistant from 1966 to 1967, research student from 1967 to 1970, and research fellow from 1970 to 1974 at King's College, Cambridge. He taught at the department of zoology, Cambridge, from 1973 to 1978.

=== Awards and honours ===
His awards and honours include:

- 1994 Mullard Award of the Royal Society
- 1995 Rank Prize for Optoelectronics
- 2002 Progress Medal of the Royal Photographic Society
- 2002 Ernst Abbe Award for Lifetime Achievement of the New York Microscopical Society
