= Harold M. Weintraub =

American scientist

- Born: Harold M. Weintraub; June 2, 1945; Newark, New Jersey, U.S.
- Died: March 28, 1995 (aged 49); Seattle, Washington, U.S.
- Education: Harvard University (AB); University of Pennsylvania (MD, PhD)
- Known for: MyoD; Control of Cellular differentiation Transcription (genetics); Chromatin structure and function
- Awards: Eli Lilly Award in Biological Chemistry (1982); Outstanding Investigator Grant, National Institutes of Health (1986); Richard Lounsbery Award (1991); Robert J. and Claire Pasarow Foundation Medical Research Award (1991)
- Scientific career
- Fields: Molecular biology Developmental Biology
- Workplaces: MRC Laboratory of Molecular Biology; Princeton University; Fred Hutchinson Cancer Research Center; University of Washington
- Doctoral advisor: Howard Holtzer, Ph.D.

Harold M. "Hal" Weintraub was an American scientist who lived from 1945 until his death in 1995 from an aggressive brain tumor. Only 49 years old, Weintraub left behind a legacy of research.

== Early life and education ==
Born on June 2, 1945, in Newark, New Jersey, Weintraub's childhood revolved around sports, including basketball, an activity he would continue to particularly relish throughout his adult life. Weintraub was also the pitcher for an all-city high school baseball team, and a football fullback.

Weintraub attended Harvard College, obtaining his bachelor's degree in 1967. He then proceeded to the University of Pennsylvania, where he earned his M.D. and Ph.D. in 1972. Weintraub performed his Ph.D. dissertation research in the laboratory of Howard Holtzer, studying red blood cell development and production (erythropoeisis) in chicken embryos. This work included the study of cell cycle kinetics, hemoglobin synthesis, and the control of cell division. The effects of bromodeoxyuridine on cell differentiation (conversion of a primitive cell into a more specialized cell) were also analyzed. While still only a graduate student, Weintraub's early work contributed significantly to the fields of developmental and cellular biology, yielding numerous peer-reviewed publications and setting the stage for the next chapter in his research explorations.

== Research achievements ==
During his abbreviated career, Weintraub was the author of more than 130 scientific articles, most of which were in top-tier, peer-reviewed journals, including the "Big 3" basic science journals: Cell, Science, and Nature. Weintraub was a member of the National Academy of Sciences, and served as editorial advisor for numerous journals.

Weintraub spent approximately a year at the Medical Research Council Laboratory of Molecular Biology in Cambridge, England, doing a postdoctoral fellowship in the laboratories of Sydney Brenner and Francis Crick. There, his studies of the nucleosome — a basic unit of DNA packaging — showed that its structure was altered when genes were actively transcribed. Weintraub returned to the United States, and between the years 1973–1977 was an assistant professor at Princeton University. His research at Princeton, which would continue during his years in Seattle, applied enzymatic and traditional biochemical isolation/separation techniques to clarify the relationship between the physical structure of genes and their expression (the process by which DNA is transcribed into messenger RNA, and eventually into Protein.) Another avenue of research in Weintraub's lab studied the effects of oncoviruses on cellular gene expression.

In 1978, Weintraub joined the Fred Hutchinson Cancer Research Center (FHCRC), established in 1971 as an independent affiliate of the University of Washington (UW), Seattle. He was a founding member of the Basic Sciences Division, and professor of genetics at UW. As described in an essay by Marc Kirschner, one of his former colleagues at Princeton, "When most of us left [Princeton] in the late 1970s, Hal, typically concerned more with research opportunity than with glamour, went to a young research institution where the practice of science would be paramount." Weintraub remained at "the Hutch" (the nickname for FHCRC) until his death in 1995. In addition, from 1990 to 1995 Weintraub was a Howard Hughes Medical Institute Investigator.

While at FHCRC, Weintraub continued and extended his prior studies of chromatin structure and function. Another of his contributions was developing the technique of using antisense RNA to create specific mutant phenotypes in vertebrate organisms. Perhaps the work for which Weintraub is best known was his laboratory's discovery and characterization of "myoD", the first master regulatory gene. When expressed, the myoD gene produces a protein referred to as MyoD (or MyoD1), which can bind certain DNA sequences, stop cell division, and elicit an entire program of muscle cell differentiation. In a series of sequential experiments, Weintraub and his students showed that myoD was able to convert fibroblasts (connective tissue cells) into myoblasts (skeletal muscle cells). Later studies by the same group of investigators at FHCRC further characterized the structural and functional characteristics of myoD and its nuclear-localized protein product, which were found to be present in organisms as diverse as nematode worms, frogs, mice, and humans. During the final years of his life, Weintraub's work used myoD to delve broadly and deeply into the areas of regulatory proteins, gene expression, and the molecular control of cell differentiation. As part of this work, his lab pioneered a molecular biology technique known as the Selection And Amplification Binding (SAAB) assay, which is used to find the DNA-binding sites for proteins.

== Biotechnology involvement ==
Along with chemist Peter Dervan of Caltech and developmental biologist Doug Melton of Harvard, Weintraub was one of three core scientific advisors to Michael L. Riordan, founder of Gilead Sciences, helping to establish the company's scientific vision at its founding during the late 1980s.

== Death and legacy ==
Weintraub died on March 28, 1995, in Seattle, Washington, as a result of complications from glioblastoma multiforme, a very aggressive and fast-growing brain tumor. He had only been diagnosed six months beforehand, undergoing neurosurgery in an attempt to curb its spread. Weintraub was survived by his wife and two sons. In the years that followed, several items were created in his memory:

- the Fred Hutch Weintraub and Groudine Fund: “established to foster intellectual exchange through the promotion of programs for graduate students, fellows and visiting scholars.”
- the Weintraub meeting, held annually since 1997, is a two-day symposium serving as a reunion for Weintraub's former graduate students, postdoctoral fellows, and scientific collaborators.
- the Harold M. Weintraub Graduate Student Award, initiated at FHCRC in 2000, occurs annually, honoring Weintraub and his commitment to innovative science, and recognizing outstanding achievement during graduate studies in the biological sciences. Students are nominated by their department/program chairperson, and submit their CV, a one-page description of their thesis work, and a recommendation letter from their research mentor. Those accepted participate in a one-day symposium, giving presentations and interacting with other students and faculty. A selection committee made up of FHCRC faculty and students select up to twelve awardees from those nominated, on the basis of quality, originality, and significance of their work, as well as to represent a broad range of research topics.
