= Akhilesh Reddy =

British professor of pharmacology

- Education: University of Cambridge
- Scientific career
- Fields: Neuroscience; Chronobiology; Genetics; Pharmacology
- Workplaces: Francis Crick Institute; MRC Laboratory of Molecular Biology

Akhilesh Reddy is a British physician-scientist. He is a professor of Systems Pharmacology and Translational Therapeutics at the University of Pennsylvania, and was previously a Wellcome Trust Senior Fellow in Clinical Sciences at the University of Cambridge and Fellow of St John's College, Cambridge.

== Early life and education ==
Reddy is of Indian origin. He completed the MB/PhD program at the University of Cambridge where he received a PhD from the MRC Laboratory of Molecular Biology.

== Research ==
In 2011, Reddy's research group demonstrated the existence of circadian clocks within human red blood cells (erythrocytes). Since human red blood cells lack a nucleus, and therefore DNA, the circadian clock posited by Reddy's group did not rely on the transcription and translation of DNA as its basis. The circadian clock observed in red blood cells could be interpreted as a form of biochemical or chemical clock, extending over a prolonged 24-hour timeframe. Sir Christopher Dobson, a British Chemist, drew parallels between this red blood cell clock, and established short-period oscillations in chemical systems.

In collaboration with the research team led by Andrew Millar in Edinburgh, Reddy's group demonstrating 24-hour oscillations that manifest in marine algae without necessitating RNA production. This demonstrated circadian rhythms in higher organisms that did not require the involvement of new RNA formation.

In 2012, Reddy's research group demonstrated that redox circadian oscillations are universally present across evolutionary epochs, spanning from bacteria to humans. To show this, they used peroxiredoxin proteins, a novel molecular perspective into circadian dynamics. Michael Rosbash stated this finding challenged conventional animal models that emphasized PER-CLK transcription. Rosbash underscored the emerging consideration of metabolism and peroxiredoxin hyperoxidation in the orchestration of circadian rhythms.

In 2018, Reddy's team showed the link between core glucose metabolism and circadian transcriptional oscillations, as well as non-canonical circadian rhythms in clock-less fruit fly cells. These findings show that there continues to be an incomplete understanding of molecular circadian rhythms in a range of organisms.

== Controversy ==
In December 2019, Reddy underwent a hearing at the Medical Practitioners Tribunal regarding alleged overpayment by both University College of London and the University of Cambridge. After unsuccessfully appealing this decision at the High Court, Reddy was suspended for nine months from the medical practice in the United Kingdom.

== Prizes and awards ==
- 2011: EMBO Young Investigator Award.
- 2012: Lister Prize.
- 2012: Colworth Medal.
- 2013: Academy of Medical Sciences Foulkes Foundation Medal.
- 2014: Elected to American Society for Clinical Investigation (ASCI).
- 2014: FEBS Anniversary Prize.
- 2015: Linacre Medal and Lecture (Royal College of Physicians).
