= Titles of distinction awarded by the University of Oxford =

The University of Oxford introduced Titles of Distinction for senior academics in the 1990s. These are not established chairs, which are posts funded by endowment for academics with a distinguished career in British and European universities. However, since there was a limited number of established chairs in these universities and an abundance of distinguished academics it was decided to introduce these Titles of Distinction. 'Reader' and the senior 'Professor' were conferred annually.

In the 1994–95 academic year, Oxford's Congregation (the university's supreme governing body) decided to confer the titles of Professor and Reader on distinguished academics without changes to their salaries or duties; the title of professor would be conferred on those whose research was "of outstanding quality", leading "to a significant international reputation". Reader would be conferred on those with "a research record of a high order, the quality of which has gained external recognition". This article provides a list of people upon whom the University of Oxford has conferred the title of professor.

In July 1996, the University announced it had appointed 162 new Professors and 99 Readers as part of this move. In January 2001, Congregation's Personnel Committee recommended that the process for awarding titles of distinction should continue biennially, and in October 2001, details of the application process for the 2001–02 academic year were published to that effect, meaning the next awards would be made in October 2002. Awards were then made in 2004, 2006 and 2008. In 2005, a special task force was set up to report back to the University Council about career progression for academics. It made its recommendations in April 2010, when it was decided that the title of Reader should be discontinued and that the title of Professor should continue to be awarded biennially. These measures were given effect by the Vice-Chancellor in May 2010. The next round of awards would be made after Trinity term 2011, but were awarded retrospectively (from October 2010); the names of that cohort were announced in January 2012. The next set of awards were made in 2014, and further sets have been made annually since.

== 2025 ==
The following were awarded the title of Professor in September 2025:

- Daniel Altshuler, Professor of Semantics and Pragmatics
- Chrystalina Antoniades, Professor of Clinical Neuroscience
- Caesar Atuire, Professor of Global Health Ethics
- Sebastian Bacon, Professor of Practice in Research Software Engineering
- Elizabeth Baldwin, Professor of Economics
- Derrick Bennett, Professor of Medical Statistics and Epidemiology
- Jelena Bezbradica Mirkovic, Professor of Immunology
- Michael Biggs, Professor of Sociology
- Jayne Birkby, Professor of Astrophysics
- Richard Bryant, Professor of Urology
- Alfonso Bueno-Orovio, Professor of Computational Modelling
- Mark Cannon, Professor of Engineering Science
- Jean-Paul Carvalho, Professor of Political Economy
- Goylette Chami, Professor of Infectious Disease Epidemiology
- Maia Chankseliani, Professor of Comparative and International Education
- David Church, Professor of Precision Oncology
- Stuart Clare, Professor of Practice in Neuroimaging
- Lynne Cox, Professor of Geroscience
- James Davies, Professor of Genomics
- Sarah De Val, Professor of Cardiovascular Science/Professor of Vascular Biology
- Volker Deringer, Professor of Materials Chemistry
- Victoria Elliott, Professor in English and Education
- Maurice Fallon, Professor of Robotics
- Marina Filip, Professor of Physics
- Yarin Gal, Professor of Machine Learning
- Audrey Gerard, Professor of Immunology
- Henk Giele, Professor of Reconstructive Plastic Surgery
- Siân Grønlie, Professor of Old Norse
- Elizabeth Hallam, Professor of Anthropology
- Gail Hayward, Professor of Primary Care
- Geoffrey Higgins, Malcolm and Margaret Howat Professor of Clinical Oncology
- Laurence Hunt, Professor of Cognitive Neuroscience
- Mallika Imwong, Professor of Molecular Parasitology
- Adrian Kelly, Professor of Ancient Greek Literature
- Rajesh Kumar Kharbanda, Professor of Cardiovascular Medicine
- Aleks Kissinger, Professor of Quantum Computing
- Jochen Koenigsmann, Professor of Mathematics
- Julien Labonne, Professor in Economics and Public Policy
- Bettina Lange, Professor of Law and Regulation
- Matthew Langton, Professor of Chemistry
- James Lewis, Professor of Korean History
- Katrina Lythgoe, Professor in Infectious Disease
- Brian Marsden, Professor of Practice in Data Management and Research Informatics
- Christopher Metcalf, Professor of Ancient Literature and Religion
- Mark Mezei, Professor of Mathematical Physics
- Borislava Mihaylova, Professor of Health Economics
- Ira Milosevic, Professor of Neuronal Physiology and Pathology
- Olivo Miotto, Professor of Evolutionary Genetics
- Christopher Morton, Professor of Museum Anthropology
- Manisha Nair, Professor of Epidemiology and Global Health
- Yuji Nakatsukasa, Professor of Numerical Analysis
- Karen Margrethe Nielsen, Professor of Ancient Greek and Roman Philosophy
- Luc Nguyen, Professor of Mathematics
- Sarah Ogilvie, Professor of Language and Lexicography
- Jacinta O’Shea, Professor of Cognitive Neuroscience
- Isabella Oyier, Professor of Molecular Epidemiology
- Fitnat Banu Pakel, Professor of Economics
- Pier Francesco Palamara, Professor of Statistical Genomics
- Panagiotis Papazoglou, Professor of Mathematics
- Simon Park, Professor of Portuguese and Translation
- Amanda Power, Professor of Medieval History
- Victor Prisacariu, Professor of Artificial Intelligence
- Bethan Psaila, Professor of Haematology
- Karthik Ramasamy, Professor of Haematology
- Maheshi Nirmala Ramasamy, Professor of Infection and Vaccinology
- Simon Rinaldi, Professor of Neurology
- Alexander Ritter, Professor of Mathematics.
- Oliver Rivero-Arias, Professor of Health Economics
- Melanie Rupflin, Professor of Mathematics
- Roberto Salguero-Gomez, Professor of Ecology
- Thomas Scott-Smith, Professor of Political Anthropology
- Mark Sheehan, Professor of Bioethics
- Sarah Snelling, Professor of Practice in Musculoskeletal Science
- Duncan Sparrow, Professor of Cardiovascular Developmental Biology
- Nicole Stoesser, Professor of Microbiology and Infectious Diseases
- Jennifer Strawbridge, Professor in New Testament and Early Christian Studies
- Greg Taylor, Professor of Digital Markets and Competition
- Patricia Thornton, Professor in the Politics of China
- Catherine Louise Thwaites, Professor of Experimental Critical Care
- Sarah Tonkin-Crine, Professor of Health Psychology
- Stephan Uphoff, Professor of Physical Microbiology
- Le Van Tan, Professor of Emerging Infectious Diseases
- Alexander Vasudevan, Professor of Urban Geography
- Robert Vilain, Professor of German and Comparative Literature
- Sam Vinko, Professor of Physics
- Mara Violato, Professor of Health Economics
- Timothee Vlandas, Professor of Comparative Political Economy and Social Policy
- Timothy Walker, Professor of Infectious Diseases
- Edmond Walsh, Professor of Engineering Science (Fluids and Heat Transfer)
- Robert James Wilkins, Professor of Practice in Medical Education
- Geoffrey Wong, Professor of Primary Care
- Hua (Cathy) Ye, Professor of Tissue Engineering
- Alan Young, Professor of Practice in Medical Informatics
- Noa Zilberman, Professor of Engineering Science

== 2024 ==
The following were awarded the title of Professor in September 2024:

- Tarik Abou-Chadi, Professor of European Politics
- David Alonso, Professor of Astrophysics
- Brian Angus, Professor of Medicine (PoP)
- Tal Arnon, Professor of Cellular Immunology
- Andrew Atherstone, Professor of Modern Anglicanism
- Marko Bacic, Professor of Engineering Science
- Oliver Bannard, Professor of Adaptive Immunity
- Edwin Barasa, Professor of Health Economics
- Julien Berestycki, Professor of Probability and Statistics
- Ronald Bertus Geskus, Professor of Medical Statistics
- Corneliu Bjola, Professor of Digital Diplomacy
- Philip Burnet, Professor of Neuroscience
- Fabrizio Caola, Professor of Physics
- Robert Carlisle, Professor of Biomedical Engineering
- Stephanie Dakin, Professor of Musculoskeletal Sciences
- Georgios Deligiannidis, Professor of Statistics
- Nele Demeyere, Professor of Neuropsychology
- Christiane Dolecek, Professor of Global Health
- Daniel Eakins, Professor of Engineering Science
- Jan Fellerer, Professor of Slavonic Languages
- Pieter Francois, Professor of Cultural Evolution
- Elizabeth Gemmill, Professor of Medieval Economic and Social History
- Fanni Gergely, Professor of Human Cell Biology
- Paul Goulart, Professor of Engineering Science
- Catherine Green, Professor of Clinical Biomanufacturing
- Ivona Hideg, Professor of Organisation Studies
- Felix Hofmann, Professor of Engineering Science
- David Humphreys, Professor of Social Policy Evaluation
- Fadi Issa, Professor of Translational Immunology
- Neil Ketchley, Professor of Politics
- Yasmin Khan, Professor of Modern History
- Moritz Kraemer, Professor of Epidemiology and Data Science
- Jamie Lachman, Professor of Child and Family Global Health
- Benn Lawson, Professor of Operations Management
- Regent Lee, Professor of Interdisciplinary Innovations
- Stuart Lee, Professor of English Literature
- Ming Lei, Professor of Physiology and Pharmacology
- Sheraz Markar, Professor of Upper Gastrointestinal Surgery
- Liliana Minichiello, Professor of Cellular and Molecular Neuroscience
- Brent Mittelstadt, Professor of Data Ethics and Policy
- Juthathip Mongkolsapaya, Professor of Viral Immunology
- Eve Morisi, Professor of Literatures in French and Political Humanities
- Mavuto Mukaka, Professor of Medical Statistics and Epidemiology
- Trevor Mutton, Professor of Teacher Education
- Vlad Mykhnenko, Professor of Geography and Political Economy
- Vidit Nanda, Professor of Mathematics
- Edward Nye, Professor of French
- Jill O’Reilly, Professor of Psychology/Computational Cognitive Neuroscience
- David Preiss, Professor of Metabolic Medicine and Clinical Trials
- Carlo Rinaldi, Professor of Molecular and Translational Neuroscience
- Damian Robinson, Professor of Maritime Archaeology
- Lothar Schermelleh, Professor of Bioimaging
- James Sheppard, Professor of Applied Health Data Science
- Justin Sirignano, Professor of Mathematics
- Adrianne Slyz, Professor of Astrophysics
- Katherine Southwood, Professor of Hebrew Bible/Old Testament
- Richard Stevens, Professor of Medical Statistics
- Alan Strathern, Professor of Global History
- Catherine Swales, Professor of Medical Education (PoP)
- Laura Swift, Professor of Greek
- David Taylor, Professor of English
- Walter Taylor, Professor of Tropical Medicine
- Maya Tudor, Professor of Politics and Public Policy
- Rachel Upthegrove, Professor of Psychiatry
- Clare Verrill, Professor of Cellular Pathology and Artificial Intelligence
- Katy Vincent, Professor of Gynaecological Pain
- Merryn Voysey, Professor of Statistics in Vaccinology
- Robert Weatherup, Professor of Energy Materials
- Claire Williams, Professor of Brazilian Literature and Culture
- Mungo Wilson, Professor of Financial Economics
- David Withers, Professor of Experimental Cancer Immunology
- Elizabeth Wonnacott, Professor of Language Science
- William Wood, Professor of Philosophical Theology
- Lucy Wooding Kostyanovsky, Professor of History
- Francesco Zanetti, Professor of Economics
- Michael Zimmermann, Professor of Human Nutrition

== 2023 ==
The following were awarded the title of Professor in September 2023:

- Uta Balbier, Professor of Modern History
- Clare Bankhead, Professor of Epidemiology and Research Design
- Christian Becker, Professor of Reproductive Sciences
- Amin Benaissa, Professor of Papyrology
- Maria Blanco, Professor of Spanish American and Comparative Literature
- Heather Bouman, Professor of Biogeochemistry
- Christian Brand, Professor of Transport, Energy and Climate Change
- Harvey Burd, Professor of Engineering Science
- Sandie Byrne, Professor of English
- Francois Caron, Professor of Statistics
- Sonya Clegg, Professor of Evolutionary Ecology
- Sue-Ann Clemens, Professor of Global Health and Clinical Development
- Samuel Cohen, Professor of Mathematics
- Amalia Coldea, Professor of Physics
- Jonathan Cook, Professor of Clinical Trials and Medical Statistics
- Vincenzo D’Angiolella, Professor of Molecular Oncology
- Julien Devriendt, Professor of Astrophysics
- David Downs, Professor of New Testament Studies
- Claire Edwards, Professor of Bone Oncology
- Robin Evans, Professor of Statistical Science
- Ben Fairfax, Professor of Cancer Immunogenetics
- Vanessa Ferreira, Professor of Cardiovascular Medicine or Professor of Medicine
- James Fitzgerald, Professor of Neural Interfacing
- Laura Fortunato, Professor of Evolutionary Anthropology (backdated to 2021)
- Marco Fritzsche, Professor of Biophysical Immunology
- Geraldine Gillespie, Professor of Molecular Immunology
- Ezequiel Gonzalez Ocantos, Professor of Comparative and Judicial Politics
- Heather Hamill, Professor of Sociology
- Robin Harding, Professor of Politics
- Neil Herring, Professor of Cardiovascular Medicine
- William Herrington, Professor of Trials and Epidemiology of Kidney Disease
- Jennifer Ingram, Professor of Mathematics Education
- Belinda Jack, Professor of French and Literary Studies
- Muhammad Javaid, Professor of Osteoporosis and Adult Rare Bone Diseases
- Aristeidis Karastergiou, Professor of Astrophysics
- Stefan Kiefer, Professor of Computer Science
- Dawid Kielak, Professor of Pure Mathematics
- Eben Kirksey, Professor of Anthropology
- Adam Kirrander, Professor of Physical and Theoretical Chemistry
- Philipp Koralus, Fulford Clarendon Professor of Philosophy and Cognitive Science
- Madhavi Krishnan, Professor of Physical Chemistry
- Simon Kyle, Professor of Experimental and Clinical Sleep Research
- Kokila Lakhoo, Professor of Global Paediatric Surgery
- Francesco Licausi, Professor of Molecular Plant Physiology
- Avi Lifschitz, Professor of Intellectual History and Enlightenment Studies
- Direk Limmaturotsakul, Professor of Infectious Disease Epidemiology
- Christopher MacMinn, Professor of Engineering Science
- Giuseppe Marcocci, Professor of Early Modern Global History
- Rogier Mars, Professor of Neurosciences
- Malcolm McCulloch, Professor of Energy Systems
- Matthew McGilvray, Professor of Engineering Science
- Ian Mills, Professor of Prostate Cancer
- Sarah Mortimer, Professor of Early Modern History
- Andrzej Murawski, Professor of Computer Science
- James Newton, Professor of Mathematics
- Harald Oberhauser, Professor of Mathematics
- Emelda Okiro, Professor of Global Health
- Siddharth Ashok Parameswaran, Professor of Physics
- Jonathan Parkin, Professor of Intellectual History
- Laura Parkkinen, Professor of Translational Neuropathology
- Nicholas Perkins, Professor of Medieval Literature
- Stefan Piechnik, Professor of Biomedical Imaging
- Patrick Rebeschini, Professor of Statistics and Machine Learning
- Anthony Reddie, Professor of Black Theology
- Oliver Rider, Professor of Cardiovascular Medicine
- Stuart Robinson, Professor of Sedimentology and Stratigraphy
- Anindita Roy, Professor of Paediatric Haematology
- Sumana Sanyal, Professor of Molecular Pathology
- Erin Saupe, Professor of Palaeobiology
- Annina Schmid, Professor of Pain Neurosciences
- Arjune Sen, Professor of Global Epilepsy
- Andrew Sharott, Professor of Neuroscience
- Louise Slater, Professor of Hydroclimatology
- Francesca Southerden, Professor of Italian
- Tara Stubbs, Professor of Modern and Contemporary Literature
- Mariarosaria Taddeo, Professor of Digital Ethics and Defence Technologies
- Paolo Tammaro, Professor of Pharmacology
- Jenny Taylor, Professor of Translational Genomics
- Alexander Teytelboym, Professor of Economics
- Hindrik Rogier Van Doorn, Professor of Infectious Diseases
- Qian Wang, Professor of Mathematics
- Zoe Waxman, Professor of Holocaust History
- Richard White, Professor of Genetics
- Michael Willis, Professor of North African Politics
- Aidong Yang, Professor of Engineering Science
- Ly-Mee Yu, Professor of Clinical Trials and Biostatistics

== 2022 ==
The following were awarded the title of Professor in September 2022:

- Sabina Alkire, Professor of Poverty and Human Development
- Wes Armour, Professor of Scientific Computing
- David Armstrong, Professor of Materials Science and Engineering
- Oreet Ashery, Professor of Contemporary Art
- Roderick Bagshaw, Professor of Law
- Esther Becker, Professor of Translational Neuroscience
- Miles Carroll, Professor of Emerging Viruses
- Alfonso Castrejon-Pita, Professor of Fluid Dynamics
- Ross Chapman, Professor of Genome Maintenance Biology
- Robert Chard, Professor of Chinese Classics
- Grant Churchill, Professor of Chemical Pharmacology
- Emma Cohen, Professor of Cognitive Anthropology
- Paul Collins, Professor of Ancient Middle East
- Sally Collins, Professor of Obstetrics
- Andrew Counter, Professor of Modern French Literature
- Gabriele De Luca, Professor of Clinical Neurology and Experimental Neuropathology
- Janina Dill, Professor of US Foreign Policy
- Aiden Doherty, Professor of Biomedical Informatics
- Ana Domingos, Professor of Neuroscience
- Sos Eltis, Professor of English and Theatre Studies
- Stefano-Maria Evangelista, Professor of English and Comparative Literature
- Katie Ewer, Professor of Vaccine Immunology
- David Eyre, Professor of Infectious Diseases
- Patrick Farrell, Professor of Scientific Computing
- Alexander Green, Professor of Neurosurgery
- Beth Greenhough, Professor of Human Geography
- Monika Gullerova, Professor of Molecular Medicine
- Ashok Handa, Professor of Vascular Surgery
- Nick Hawes, Professor of Artificial Intelligence and Robotics
- Ian Hewitt, Professor of Applied Mathematics
- Andrew Higgins, Professor of Civil Justice Systems
- Timothy Humphrey, Professor of Molecular Genetics
- Freya Johnston, Professor of English Literature
- Man-Yee Kan, Professor of Sociology
- Ridhi Kashyap, Professor of Demography and Computational Social Science
- Steven Kelly, Professor of Plant Sciences
- Anders Kock, Professor of Economics
- Clare Leaver, Professor of Economics and Public Policy
- Andrew Higgins, Professor of Civil Justice Systems
- Timothy Humphrey, Professor of Molecular Genetics
- Freya Johnston, Professor of English Literature
- Man-Yee Kan, Professor of Sociology
- Ridhi Kashyap, Professor of Demography and Computational Social Science
- Francis Leneghan, Professor of Old English
- Yoel Lubell, Professor of Global Health
- Marc Macias Fauria, Professor of Biogeosciences
- Kamal Mahtani, Professor of Evidence Based Healthcare
- Hauke Marquardt, Professor of Earth Sciences
- Nayanika Mathur, Professor of Anthropology and South Asian Studies
- Fiona Mcconnell, Professor of Political Geography
- Dirk Meyer, Professor of Chinese Philosophy
- Laurent Mignon, Professor of Turkish Literature
- Thomas Milne, Professor of Haematology
- Andrea Mondino, Professor of Mathematics
- Charles Monroe, Professor of Engineering Science
- Benjamin Morgan, Professor of German and Comparative Literature
- Stephen Morris, Professor of Engineering Science
- Derek Moulton, Professor of Applied Mathematics
- Tarje Nissen-Meyer, Professor of Geophysics
- Andrew Przybylski, Professor of Human Behaviour and Technology
- Kasper Rasmussen, Professor of Information Security
- Aaron Reeves, Professor of Sociology and Social policy
- Heath Rose, Professor of Applied Linguistics
- Ramon Sarró, Professor of Social Anthropology
- Sara Shaw, Professor of Translational Health, Policy and Practice
- Nicola Smart, Professor of Cardiovascular Science
- Frank Smithuis, Professor of Tropical medicine
- Ngoc Son Bui, Professor of Asian Laws
- Annie Sutherland, Professor of Medieval Literature
- Huiling Tan, Professor of Human Electrophysiology and Neuromodulation
- Jeff Tseng, Professor of Physics
- Lorenz Von Seidlein, Professor of Global Health
- Sandra Wachter, Professor of Technology and Regulation
- Mark Walton, Professor of Behavioural Neuroscience
- George Warimwe, Professor of Vaccinology
- Daniel Wilson, Professor of Disease Genomics
- Sam Wolfe, Professor of French and Romance Linguistics
- Jonathan Yates, Professor of Materials Modelling

== 2021 ==
The following were awarded the title of Professor in January 2022:

- Abigail Adams-Prassl, Professor of Economics
- Hazel Assender, Professor of Materials
- Mona Bafadhel, Professor of Respiratory Medicine
- Andrew Baldwin, Professor of NMR Spectroscopy and Biophysical Chemistry
- Christopher Beem, Professor of Mathematics and Theoretical Physics
- Teresa Bejan, Professor of Political Theory
- Sarah Blagden, Professor of Experimental Oncology
- Philip Blunsom, Professor of Computer Science
- Sanja Bogojevic, Professor of Law
- Pedro Bordalo, Professor of Financial Economics
- Thomas Bowden, Professor of Structural Biology
- Lucy Bowes, Professor of Developmental Psychopathology
- Dominic Brookshaw, Professor of Persian Literature and Iranian Culture
- Michael Browning, Professor of Computational Psychiatry
- Alexander Bullock, Professor of Structural and Chemical Biology
- Theresa Burt de Perera, Professor of Animal Behaviour
- Jonathan Burton, Professor of Organic Chemistry
- Muhammed Cader, Professor of Neuroscience and Neurology
- Coralia Cartis, Professor of Numerical Optimization
- Susana Carvalho, Professor of Palaeoanthropology
- Peter Charbel-Issa, Professor of Ophthalmology
- Katrina Charles, Professor of Environmental Health Risks
- Erica Charters, Professor of the Global History of Medicine
- Phaik Yeong Cheah, Professor of Global Health
- John Christianson, Professor of Cell Biology
- Katherine Clarke, Professor of Greek and Roman Historiography
- Stefan Constantinescu, Professor of Cancer Signalling
- Justin Coon, Professor of Engineering Science
- Bruno Currie, Professor of Greek Literature
- Jan-Emmanuel De Neve, Professor of Economics and Behavioural Science
- Amy Dickman, Professor of Wildlife Conservation
- Cheryl Doss, Professor of International Development
- Jennifer Dowd, Professor of Demography and Population Health
- Susanna Dunachie, Professor of Infectious Diseases
- Omer Dushek, Professor of Molecular Immunology
- Matthew Dyson, Professor of Civil and Criminal Law
- Fumiko Esashi, Professor of Molecular Biophysics
- Mina Fazel, Professor of Adolescent Psychiatry
- Dominik Fischer, Professor of Ophthalmology
- Stephen Fisher, Professor of Political Sociology
- Mark Fricker, Professor of Plant Sciences
- Christopher Gerry, Professor of Public Health and Health Economics in Russia and Eastern Europe
- Nazila Ghanea, Professor of International Human Rights Law
- John-Paul Ghobrial, Professor of Modern and Global History
- Peter Ghosh, Professor of the History of Ideas
- Imogen Goold, Professor of Medical Law
- Anne Goriely, Professor of Human Genetics
- Ulrike Grüneberg, Professor of Molecular Cell Biology
- Margaret Hillenbrand, Professor of Modern Chinese Literature and Culture
- Ling-Pei Ho, Professor of Respiratory Immunology
- Sally Hopewell, Professor of Clinical Trials and Evidence Synthesis
- Joshua Hordern, Professor of Christian Ethics
- David Howey, Professor of Engineering Science
- Wei Huang, Professor of Biological Engineering
- Matthew Husband, Professor in Psycholinguistics
- Sarosh Irani, Professor of Autoimmune Neurology
- Ben Jackson, Professor of Modern History
- Susan James Relly, Professor in Vocational Education
- Lars Jansen, Professor of Molecular Genetics
- Saad Jbabdi, Professor of Biomedical Engineering
- Howard Jones, Professor of Finance
- Akane Kawamura, Professor of Chemical Biology
- Ian Kiaer, Professor of Contemporary Art
- Jiuen Kiaer, Young Bin Min-KF Professor of Korean Linguistics
- Patricia Kingori, Professor of Global Health Ethics
- Morten Kringelbach, Professor of Neuroscience
- Teresa Lambe, Professor of Vaccinology and Immunology
- Charlie Louth, Professor of German and Comparative Literature
- Glen Loutzenhiser, Professor of Tax Law
- Anneke Lucassen, Professor of Genomic Medicine
- Lambros Malafouris, Professor of Cognitive and Anthropological Archaeology
- Andrew Markham, Professor of Computer Science
- Richard Maude, Professor of Tropical Medicine
- Karolina Milewicz, Professor of International Relations
- Helen Moore, Professor of English Literature
- Robin Murphy, Professor of Experimental Psychology
- Sonali Nag, Professor of Psychology and Education
- Friederike Otto, Professor of Climate Impact Research
- Dimitris Papanikolaou, Professor of Modern Greek and Comparative Cultural Studies
- J P Park, June and Simon Li Professor in the History of Chinese Art
- Alexander Paseau, Professor of Mathematical Philosophy
- Elinor Payne, Professor of Phonetics and Phonology
- Stuart Peirson, Professor of Circadian Neuroscience
- Gail Preston, Professor of Plant–Microbe Interactions
- Joel Rasmussen, Professor of Historical and Philosophical Theology
- Sophie Ratcliffe, Professor of Literature and Creative Criticism
- Martin Ruhs, Professor of Political Economy
- Susanna-Assunta Sansone, Professor of Data Readiness
- Peter Scarborough, Professor of Population Health
- Martin Schmalz, Professor of Finance and Economics
- Annette Schuh, Professor of Molecular Diagnostics
- Benjamin Seymour, Professor of Clinical Neuroscience
- Yang Shi, Professor of Epigenetics
- Sebastian Shimeld, Professor of Evolutionary Developmental Biology
- Victoria Smith, Professor of Tephrochronology
- Matthew Snape, Professor of Paediatrics and Vaccinology
- Maria Stamatopoulou, Professor of Classical Archaeology
- Simon Stanworth, Professor of Transfusion Medicine and Haematology
- Nicolaos Stavropoulos, Professor of Law and Philosophy
- Sandy Steel, Professor of Law and Philosophy of Law
- Nikita Sud, Professor of the Politics of Development
- Carolyn Taylor, Professor of Oncology
- George Tofaris, Professor of Neurology and Translational Neuroscience
- Ruth Travis, Professor of Epidemiology
- Lindsay Turnbull, Professor of Plant Ecology
- Paul Turner, Professor of Paediatric Microbiology
- Antonios Tzanakopoulos, Professor of Public International Law
- Laura Van Broekhoven, Professor of Museum Studies, Ethics, and Material Culture
- Kristin van Zwieten, Professor of Law and Finance
- Vladyslav Vyazovskiy, Professor of Sleep Physiology
- David Wallom, Professor of Informatics
- Peter Watkinson, Professor of Intensive Care Medicine
- Dagan Wells, Professor of Reproductive Genetics

== 2020 ==
The following were awarded the title of Professor in November 2020:

- William Allan, Professor of Greek
- Ruben Andersson, Professor of Social Anthropology
- Sonia Antoranz Contera, Professor of Biological Physics
- Elizabeth Ashley, Professor of Tropical Medicine
- Michael Barnes, Professor of Physics
- Stephen Baxter, Professor of Medieval History
- Rebecca Beasley, Professor of Modernist Studies
- Geoffrey Bird, Professor of Cognitive Neuroscience
- Stuart Blacksell, Professor of Tropical Microbiology
- Lapo Bogani, Professor of Molecular Nanomaterials
- Francesca Bufa, Professor of Computational Biology and Cancer Genomics
- Erzsebet Bukodi, Professor of Sociology and Social Policy
- Álvaro Cartea, Professor of Mathematical Finance
- Michael Charles, Professor of Environmental Archaeology
- Yulin Chen, Professor of Physics
- Morgan Clarke, Professor of Social Anthropology
- Mark Coles, Kennedy Professor of Immunology
- Garret Cotter, Professor of Physics
- Inge Daniels, Professor of Anthropology
- Armand D'Angour, Professor of Classics
- John Davis, Professor of Pharmaceutical Discovery
- Thomas Douglas, Professor of Applied Philosophy
- David Doyle, Professor of Comparative Politics
- David Dupret, Professor of Neuroscience
- Carolin Duttlinger, Professor of German Literature and Culture
- David Dwan, Professor of English Literature and Intellectual History
- Rebecca Eynon, Professor of Education, the Internet and Society
- Dominic Furniss, Professor of Plastic and Reconstructive Surgery
- Jason Gaiger, Professor of Aesthetics and Art Theory
- Anthony Gardner, Professor of Contemporary Art History
- Jane Gingrich, Professor of Comparative Political Economy
- Andrew Gosler, Professor of Ethno-ornithology
- David Grifths, Professor of Archaeology
- Nina Hallowell, Professor of Social and Ethical Aspects of Genomics
- Todd Hancock Hall, Professor of International Relations
- Edward Harcourt, Professor of Philosophy
- Heather Harrington, Professor of Mathematics
- Catherine Holmes, Professor of Medieval History
- Jemma Hopewell, Professor of Precision Medicine and Epidemiology
- Laura Hoyano, Professor of Law
- Antoine Jerusalem, Professor of Mechanical Engineering
- Helen Johnson, Professor of Ocean and Climate Science
- Polly Jones, Professor of Russian
- Lindsay Judson, Professor of Ancient Philosophy
- Renaud Lambiotte, Professor of Networks and Nonlinear Systems
- Liora Lazarus, Professor in Human Rights Law
- Vili Lehdonvirta, Professor of Economic Sociology and Digital Social Research
- Jason Lerch, Professor of Neuroscience
- Jamie Lorimer, Professor of Environmental Geography
- James McCullagh, Professor of Biological Chemistry
- Anna-Maria Misra, Professor of Global History
- Joe Moshenska, Professor of English Literature
- Andreas Münch, Professor of Applied Mathematics
- Gina Neff, Professor of Technology and Society
- Andrea Nemeth, Professor of Neurogenetics
- Jaideep Pandit, Professor of Anaesthesia
- Aris Theodosis Papageorghiou, Professor of Fetal Medicine
- Sarah Pendlebury, Professor of Medicine and Old Age Neuroscience
- Justine Pila, Professor of Law
- John Powell, Professor of Digital Health Care
- Kazem Rahimi, Professor of Cardiovascular Medicine and Population Health
- Jan Rehwinkel, Professor of Innate Immunology
- Armin Reichold, Professor of Physics
- Laura Rival, Professor of Anthropology of Development
- Tatjana Sauka-Spengler, Professor of Developmental Genomics and Gene Regulation
- Elena Seiradake, Professor of Molecular Biology
- Joel Shapiro, Professor of Financial Economics
- Hannah Smithson, Professor of Experimental Psychology
- Susannah Speller, Professor of Materials Science
- Andrei Starinets, Professor of Physics
- Samuel Staton, Professor of Computer Science
- Zofia Stemplowska, Professor of Political Theory
- Peter Stewart, Professor of Ancient Art
- Mark Stokes, Professor of Cognitive Neuroscience
- William Swadling, Professor of Law
- Pawel Swietach, Professor of Physiology
- Helen Swift, Professor of Medieval French Studies
- Marion Turner, Professor of English Literature
- Ellie Tzima, Professor of Cardiovascular Biology
- Carlos Vargas-Silva, Professor in Migration Studies
- Manu Vatish, Professor of Obstetrics
- Andrea Vedaldi, Professor of Computer Vision and Machine Learning
- John Vella, Professor of Law
- Richard Williams, Professor of Immunology
- Tim Woollings, Professor of Physical Climate Science

== 2019 ==
The following were awarded the title of Professor in October 2019:

- Alessandro Abate, Professor of Verification and Control
- Naomi Allen, Professor of Epidemiology
- Walter Armbrust, Professor of Modern Middle Eastern Studies
- Richard Bailey, Professor of Environmental Systems
- Justin Benesch, Professor of Biophysical Chemistry
- Dora Biro, Professor of Animal Behaviour
- Rafal Bogacz, Professor of Computational Neuroscience
- Neil Bowles, Professor of Planetary Science
- Holly Bridge, Professor of Neuroscience
- Andrea Cipriani, Professor of Psychiatry
- David Clifton, Professor of Engineering Science
- Rachel Condry, Professor of Criminology
- Ben Cooper, Professor of Epidemiology
- Cathryn Costello, Professor of Refugee and Migration Law
- Xenia de la Ossa, Professor of Mathematical Physics
- Julie Dickson, Professor of Legal Philosophy
- Susan Downes, Professor of Ophthalmology
- Hal Drakesmith, Professor of Iron Biology
- Andrew Eggers, Professor of Politics
- Richard Ekins, Professor of Law
- Jonathan Emberson, Professor of Medical Statistics and Epidemiology
- Andrew Farmery, Professor of Anaesthetics
- Ian Forrest, Professor of Social and Religious History
- Eamonn Gaffney, Professor of Applied Mathematics
- Dev Gangjee, Professor of Intellectual Property Law
- Constanze Güthenke, Professor of Greek Literature
- Claire Gwenlan, Professor of Physics
- Richard Haynes, Professor of Renal Medicine and Clinical Trials
- Therese Hopfenbeck, Professor of Educational Assessment
- Michele Hu, Professor of Clinical Neuroscience
- Jim Hughes, Professor of Gene Regulation
- Stephen Hyde, Professor of Molecular Therapy
- Guy Kahane, Professor of Moral Philosophy
- Maureen Kelley, Professor of Bioethics
- Tarunabh Khaitan, Professor of Public Law and Legal Theory
- Kayla King, Professor of Evolutionary Ecology
- Andrew Klevan, Professor of Film Aesthetics
- Simon Leedham, Professor of Gastroenterology
- Belinda Lennox, Professor of Psychiatry
- Marina MacKay, Professor of English Literature
- Michèle Mendelssohn, Professor of English and American Literature
- Sassy Molyneux, Professor of Global Health
- Natalia Nowakowska, Professor of European History
- Piero Olliaro, Professor of Poverty Related Infectious Diseases
- Michael Osborne, Professor of Machine Learning
- Jacqueline Palace, Professor of Neurology
- Felix Ignacio Parra Diaz, Professor of Physics
- Susan Perkin, Professor of Physical Chemistry
- Jeremias Prassl, Professor of Law
- Josephine Quinn, Professor of Ancient History
- Kristijan Ramadan, Professor of Molecular Medicine
- Fraydoon Rastinejad, Professor of Biochemistry and Structural Biology
- Moritz Riede, Professor of Soft Functional Nanomaterials
- Jacob Rowbottom, Professor of Law
- Andrea Ruggeri, Professor of Political Science and International Relations
- Rick Schulting, Professor of Scientific and Prehistoric Archaeology
- Tim Schwanen, Professor of Transport Studies and Geography
- Karin Sigloch, Professor of Geophysics
- Claudio Sillero-Zubiri, Professor of Conservation Biology
- Michael Smets, Professor of Management
- Lorna Smith, Professor of Chemistry
- Angela Taylor, Professor of Experimental Astrophysics
- Peter Thonemann, Professor of Ancient History
- Kate Tunstall, Professor of French
- Frank von Delft, Professor of Structural Chemical Biology
- Caroline Warman, Professor of French Literature and Thought
- Michael Whitworth, Professor of Modern Literature and Culture
- Niall Winters, Professor of Education and Technology
- Luet Wong, Professor of Chemistry
- Sarah Wordsworth, Professor of Health Economics and Genomics

== 2018 ==
The following were awarded the title of Professor in September 2018:

- David Aanensen, Professor of Genomic Epidemiology
- Laura Ashe, Professor of English Literature
- Miguel Angel Ballester, Professor of Economics
- Masooda Bano, Professor of Development Studies
- William Barford, Professor of Theoretical Chemistry
- Jonathan Barrett, Professor of Quantum Information Science
- Dmitry Belyaev, Professor of Mathematics
- Louise Bowman, Professor of Medicine and Clinical Trials
- Paul Brennan, Professor of Medicinal Chemistry
- Christopher Buckley, Professor of Translational Inflammation Research
- Felix Budelmann, Professor of Greek Literature
- Daron Burrows, Professor of Medieval French
- Paul Chaisty, Professor of Russian and East European Politics
- Juan-Carlos Conde, Professor of Medieval Spanish Literature and Philology
- Simon Dadson, Professor of Hydrology
- Wolfgang de Melo, Professor of Classical Philology
- Faisal Devji, Professor of Indian History
- Cristina Dondi, Professor of Early European Book Heritage
- Simon Draper, Professor of Vaccinology and Translational Medicine
- Andrea Ferrero, Professor of Economics
- Stephen Fletcher, Professor of Chemistry
- Gary Ford, Professor of Stroke Medicine
- Jonathan Grimes, Professor of Structural Virology
- Dan Hicks, Professor of Contemporary Archaeology
- Leanne Hodson, Professor of Metabolic Physiology
- Rob Hope, Professor of Water Policy
- Marie-Chantal Killeen, Professor of French Literature
- Nicholas Lakin, Professor of Molecular and Cellular Biology
- Sarah Lewington, Professor of Epidemiology and Medical Statistics
- Anna Lisa Lora-Wainwright, Professor of the Human Geography of China
- James McDougall, Professor of Modern and Contemporary History
- Peter McHugh, Professor of Molecular Oncology
- Craig MacLean, Professor of Evolution and Microbiology
- Lars-Erik Malmberg, Professor of Quantitative Methods in Education
- Ivan Martinovic, Professor of Computer Science
- Adam Mead, Professor of Haematology
- Eric O'Neill, Professor of Cell and Molecular Biology
- Stephen John Payne, Professor of Engineering Science
- Ludovic Phalippou, Professor of Financial Economics
- Ingmar Posner, Professor of Engineering Science (Applied Artificial Intelligence)
- Jonathan Prag, Professor of Ancient History
- Daniel Prieto-Alhambra, Professor of Pharmaco- and Device Epidemiology
- Najib Rahman, Professor of Respiratory Medicine
- Felix Reed-Tsochas, Professor of Complex Systems
- Angela Russell, Professor of Medicinal Chemistry
- Diego Sánchez-Ancochea, Professor of the Political Economy of Development
- Clive Siviour, Professor of Engineering Science
- Rebeccah Slater, Professor of Paediatric Neuroscience
- Ricardo Soares de Oliveira, Professor of the International Politics of Africa
- Charlotte Stagg, Professor of Human Neurophysiology
- Jin-Chong Tan, Professor of Engineering Science (Nanoscale Engineering)
- Christopher Timpson, Professor of Philosophy of Physics
- Damian Tyler, Professor of Physiological Metabolism
- Holm Uhlig, Professor of Paediatric Gastroenterology
- Shimon Whiteson, Professor of Computer Science
- Richard Willden, Professor of Engineering Science
- Brian Young, Professor of Intellectual History

== 2017 ==
The following were awarded the title of Professor in September 2017:

- Aziz Aboobaker, Professor of Functional and Comparative Genomics
- Charalambos Antoniades, Professor of Cardiovascular Medicine
- Konstantin Ardakov, Professor of Mathematics
- Nicholas Barber, Professor of Constitutional Law and Theory
- Karen Barker, Professor of Physiotherapy
- Roger Benson, Professor of Palaeobiology
- Matthew Bevis, Professor of English Literature
- Dan Ciubotaru, Professor of Mathematics
- Jacob Dahl, Professor of Assyriology
- Jeremy Day, Professor of Infectious Diseases
- Marella de Bruijn, Professor of Developmental Haematopoiesis
- Xon de Ros, Professor of Modern Spanish Studies
- Pavlos Eleftheriadis, Professor of Public Law
- Peter Frankopan, Professor of Global History
- John Frater, Professor of Infectious Diseases
- Peter Gething, Professor of Epidemiology
- Deborah Gill, Professor of Gene Medicine
- Christina Goldschmidt, Professor of Probability
- James Goudkamp, Professor of the Law of Obligations
- Sarah Green, Professor of the Law of Obligations
- Ulrich Haisch, Professor of Physics
- Ester Hammond, Professor of Molecular Cancer Biology
- Sondra Hausner, Professor of Anthropology of Religion
- Christopher Hays, Professor of Physics
- Geraldine Hazbun, Professor of Medieval Spanish Literature
- David Hopkin, Professor of European Social History
- Mark Howarth, Professor of Protein Nanotechnology
- Andrew Judge, Professor of Translational Statistics
- Andras Juhasz, Professor of Mathematics
- Aris Katzourakis, Professor of Evolution and Genomics
- Paulina Kewes, Professor of English Literature
- David Kirk, Professor of Sociology
- Pramila Krishnan, Professor of Development Economics
- Alan Lauder, Professor of Mathematics
- Cecilia Lindgren, Professor of Genomic Endocrinology & Metabolism
- Elena Lombardi, Professor of Italian Literature
- Derek McCormack, Professor of Cultural Geography
- Kevin McGerty, Professor of Mathematics
- David Mole, Professor of Renal Medicine
- Michael Moody, Professor of Materials
- Marc Mulholland, Professor of Modern History
- Rasmus Kleis Nielsen, Professor of Political Communication
- Mohamed Omri, Professor of Arabic and Comparative Literature
- Antonis Papachristodoulou, Professor of Engineering Science
- David Parrott, Professor of Early Modern European History
- Claudia Pazos Alonso, Professor of Portuguese and Gender Studies
- Ian Phillips, Professor of Philosophy
- Timothy Power, Professor of Latin American Politics
- Christoph Reisinger, Professor of Applied Mathematics
- Grant Ritchie, Professor of Chemistry
- Philip Robins, Professor of Middle East Politics
- Eduard Sanders, Professor of Global Health Practice
- Nicolai Sinai, Professor of Islamic Studies
- Martin Smith, Professor of Organic Chemistry
- Gabriel Stylianides, Professor of Mathematics Education
- Laura Tunbridge, Professor of Music
- Renier van der Hoorn, Professor of Plant Science
- Kylie Vincent, Professor of Inorganic Chemistry
- Caleb Webber, Professor of Bioinformatics
- Jan Westerhoff, Professor of Buddhist Philosophy
- Catherine Whistler, Professor of the History of European Art
- Rebecca Williams, Professor of Public Law and Criminal Law
- Jennifer Yee, Professor of Literature in French
- Peijun Zhang, Professor of Structural Biology

== 2016 ==
The following were awarded the title of Professor in September 2016:

- Edward Anderson, Professor of Organic Chemistry
- Radu Aricescu, Professor of Molecular Neuroscience
- Ash Asudeh, Professor of Semantics
- Stephen Baker, Professor of Molecular Microbiology
- Giles Barr, Professor of Physics
- Helen Barr, Professor of English Literature
- Alan Beggs, Professor of Economics
- Richard Berry, Professor of Biological Physics
- Harish Bhaskaran, Professor of Applied Nanomaterials
- Philip Biggin, Professor of Computational Biochemistry
- Ben Bollig, Professor of Spanish American Literature
- Persephone Borrow, Professor of Viral Immunology
- Alexandra Braun, Professor of Comparative Private Law
- Mark Buckley, Professor of Behavioural and Cognitive Neuroscience
- Michele Cappellari, Professor of Astrophysics
- Liz Carpenter, Professor of Membrane Protein Structural Biology
- Gary Collins, Professor of Medical Statistics
- Patricia Daley, Professor of the Human Geography of Africa
- Susan Doran, Professor of Early-Modern British History
- Lucy Dorrell, Professor of Immunology
- Roel Dullens, Professor of Chemistry
- Edith Elkind, Professor of Computer Science
- Nick Eyre, Professor of Energy and Climate Policy
- Dmitry Filatov, Professor of Evolutionary Genetics
- Jose Goicoechea, Professor of Chemistry
- Mark Graham, Professor of Internet Geography
- Ashleigh Griffin, Professor of Evolutionary Biology
- Martyn Harry, Professor of Composition
- Thorsten Hesjedal, Professor of Condensed Matter Physics
- Anne Kiltie, Professor of Experimental Clinical Oncology
- Philipp Kukura, Professor of Chemistry
- Carolyne Larrington, Professor of Medieval European Literature
- Petros Ligoxygakis, Professor of Innate Immunology
- Paul Lodge, Professor of Philosophy
- Nikolaj Lubecker, Professor of French and Film Studies
- Clare Mackay, Professor of Imaging Neuroscience
- Kate McLoughlin, Professor of English Literature
- Daria Martin, Professor of Art
- Eric T. Meyer, Professor of Social Informatics
- Christiaan Monden, Professor of Sociology and Demography
- Rachel Murphy, Professor of Chinese Development and Society
- Micah Muscolino, Professor of Modern Chinese History
- Simon Newstead, Professor of Molecular Membrane Biology
- Alis Elena Oancea, Professor of Philosophy of Education and Research Policy
- Dan Olteanu, Professor of Computer Science
- Hemant Pandit, Professor of Orthopaedic Surgery
- Fernanda Pirie, Professor of the Anthropology of Law
- Philomen Probert, Professor of Classical Philology and Linguistics
- Amar Rangan, Professor of Orthopaedic Surgery
- Jeremy Robertson, Professor of Chemistry
- Ulrike Roesler, Professor of Tibetan and Himalayan Studies
- Gervase Rosser, Professor of the History of Art
- Jurgen Schneider, Professor of Medical Imaging
- Robert Scotland, Professor of Systematic Botany
- Christian Siebold, Professor of Structural Biology
- Peter Simmonds, Professor of Virology
- Jason Smith, Professor of Photonic Materials and Devices
- Adam Smyth, Professor of English Literature and the History of the Book
- Shankar Srinivas, Professor of Developmental Biology
- Jonny Steinberg, Professor of African Studies
- Joel Tarning, Professor of Clinical Pharmacology
- Dmitrios Tsomocos, Professor of Financial Economics
- Benoit Van den Eynde, Professor of Tumour Immunology
- Dominic Vella, Professor of Applied Mathematics
- Lisa White, Professor of Modelling and Epidemiology
- Dominic Wilkinson, Professor of Medical Ethics
- Mark Woolrich, Professor of Computational Neuroscience
- James Wright, Professor of Orthopaedics
- Alison L. Young, Professor of Public Law

== 2015 ==
The following were awarded the title of Professor in November 2015:

- Lesley Abrams, Professor of Early Medieval History
- Colin Akerman, Professor of Neuroscience
- Daniel Anthony, Professor of Experimental Neuropathology
- Arzhang Ardavan, Professor of Physics
- Rhiannon Ash, Professor of Roman Historiography
- James Berkley, Professor of Paediatric Infectious Diseases
- Alexander Betts, Professor of Forced Migration and International Affairs
- Colin Burrow, Professor of English and Comparative Literature
- Mark Chapman, Professor of the History of Modern Theology
- Mindy Chen-Wishart, Professor of the Law of Contract
- Lucie Cluver, Professor of Child and Family Social Work
- Roi Cohen Kadosh, Professor of Cognitive Neuroscience
- Joseph Conlon, Professor of Theoretical Physics
- Cas Cremers, Professor of Information Security
- Bernardo Cuenca Grau, Professor of Computer Science
- Matt Friedman, Professor of Palaeobiology
- Robert Gilbert, Professor of Biophysics
- Kathryn Gleadle, Professor of Gender and Women's History
- Stephen Goodwin, Professor of Neurogenetics
- Vicente Grau, Professor of Biomedical Image Analysis
- Abigail Green, Professor of Modern European History
- Steven Gunn, Professor of Early Modern History
- Michael Hayward, Professor of Inorganic Chemistry
- Stephen Heyworth, Professor of Latin
- Jane Hiddleston, Professor of Literatures in French
- Matthew Higgins, Professor of Molecular Parasitology
- Peter Horby, Professor of Emerging Infectious Diseases and Global Health
- Susan Jones, Professor of English Literature
- Richard Katz, Professor of Geodynamics
- Greger Larson, Professor of Evolutionary Genomics
- Sergio Lozano-Perez, Professor of Materials Science
- David Lucas, Professor of Physics
- Ian Maclachlan, Professor of French Literature
- Sophie Marnett, Professor of Medieval French Studies
- Ankhi Mukherjee, Professor of English and World Literatures
- Simon Myers, Professor of Mathematical Genomics
- Donal Nolan, Professor of Private Law
- Jan Obloj, Professor of Mathematics
- Brian Parkinson, Professor of Social Psychology
- Senia Paseta, Professor of Modern History
- Eugene Rogan, Professor of Modern Middle Eastern History
- Alison Salvesen, Professor of Early Judaism and Christianity
- Richard Scholar, Professor of French and Comparative Literature
- Nathalie Seddon, Professor of Biodiversity
- Kirsten Shepherd-Barr, Professor of English and Theatre Studies
- Anna Katharina Simon, Professor of Immunology
- Emma Smith, Professor of Shakespeare Studies
- Christopher Summerfield, Professor of Cognitive Neuroscience
- Denis Talbot, Professor of Cancer Medicine
- Madalena Tarsounas, Professor of Molecular and Cell Biology
- Caroline Terquem, Professor of Physics
- James Tilley, Professor of Politics
- Selina Todd, Professor of Modern History
- Simon Travis, Professor of Clinical Gastroenterology
- Niki Trigoni, Professor of Computer Science
- Stephen Tucker, Professor of Biophysics
- Martin Turner, Professor of Clinical Neurology & Neuroscience
- Christopher Tyerman, Professor of History of the Crusades
- Bart van Es, Professor of English Literature
- Richard Wade-Martins, Professor of Molecular Neuroscience
- Richard Walker, Professor of Earth Sciences
- John Wheater, Professor of Physics
- Clive Wilson, Professor of Cell and Developmental Genetics
- Biao Xiang, Professor of Social Anthropology
- Krina Zondervan, Professor of Reproductive & Genomic Epidemiology

== 2014 ==
The following were awarded the title of Professor by the University in November 2014:

- Suzanne Aigrain, Professor of Astrophysics
- Dapo Akande, Professor of Public International Law
- Roy Allison, Professor of Russian and Eurasian International Relations
- Pamela Anderson, Professor of Modern European Philosophy of Religion
- John Kevin Baird, Professor of Malariology
- Eleanor Barnes, Professor of Hepatology and Experimental Medicine
- Alan Barr, Professor of Particle Physics
- Philip Bejon, Professor of Tropical Medicine
- Simon Benjamin, Professor of Quantum Technologies
- David Bennett, Professor of Neurology and Neurobiology
- Amy Bogaard, Professor of Neolithic and Bronze Age Archaeology
- Michael Bonsall, Professor of Mathematical Biology
- Martin Booth, Professor of Engineering Science
- Mary Bosworth, Professor of Criminology
- Ian Brown, Professor of Information Security and Privacy
- Thomas Buchanan, Professor of Modern British and European History
- Malcolm Bull, Professor of Art and the History of Ideas,
- Philip Bullock, Professor of Russian Literature and Music
- Andrew Bunker, Professor of Astrophysics
- Martin Bureau, Professor of Astrophysics
- Martin Burton, Professor of Otolaryngology
- Byron Byrne, Professor of Engineering Science
- Marco Capogna, Professor of Cellular Neuropharmacology
- William Child, Professor of Philosophy
- Tim Claridge, Professor of Magnetic Resonance
- Robert Clarke, Professor of Epidemiology and Public Health Medicine
- Simon Clarke, Professor of Chemistry
- Radu Coldea, Professor of Physics
- Christopher Conlon, Professor of Infectious Diseases
- Martin Conway, Professor of Contemporary European History
- Stephanie Cragg, Professor of Neuroscience
- Julie Curtis, Professor of Russian Literature
- John Darwin, Professor of Global and Imperial History
- Grigory Dianov, Professor of Molecular Biochemistry
- Kim Dora, Professor of Microvascular Pharmacology
- Robert Douglas-Fairhurst, Professor of English Literature
- Jonathan Doye, Professor of Theoretical Chemistry
- Joanna Dunkley, Professor of Astrophysics
- Mark Edwards, Professor of Early Christian Studies
- Christian Eggeling, Professor of Molecular Immunology
- John Elsner, Professor of Late Antique Art
- Radek Erban, Professor of Mathematics
- Colin Espie, Professor of Sleep Medicines
- Louise Fawcett, Professor of International Relations
- Seena Fazel, Professor of Forensic Psychiatry
- Liz Fisher, Professor of Environmental Law
- Andrew Fowler, Professor of Applied Mathematics
- Susan Fuggle, Professor of Transplant Immunology
- Nicola Gardini, Professor of Italian and Comparative Literature
- George Garnett, Professor of Medieval History
- Christine Gerrard, Professor of English Literature
- Matthew Gibney, Professor of Politics and Forced Migration
- Susan Gillingham, Professor of the Hebrew Bible
- Feliciano Giustino, Professor of Materials
- Anna Gloyn, Professor of Molecular Genetics and Metabolism
- Sion Glyn-Jones, Professor of Orthopaedic Surgery
- Andrew Goodwin, Professor of Materials Chemistry
- Manuele Gragnolati, Professor of Italian Literature
- Jane Green, Professor of Epidemiology
- Daniel Grimley, Professor of Music
- Hanneke Grootenboer, Professor of the History of Art
- Philippe Guerin, Professor of Epidemiology and Global Health
- Nicholas Halmi, Professor of English and Comparative Literature
- Anthony Harnden, Professor of Primary Care
- Bob Harris, Professor of British History
- Ralf Hinze, Professor of Software Engineering
- Christopher Hodges, Professor of Justice Systems
- Peter Howell, Professor of Applied Mathematics
- Joanna Innes, Professor of Modern History
- Cigdem Issever, Professor of Particle Physics
- Matthew Jarvis, Professor of Astrophysics
- Mark Jenkinson, Professor of Neuroimaging
- Hugh Jenkyns, Professor of Stratigraphy
- Marina Jirotka, Professor of Human Centred Computing
- Thomas Johansen, Professor of Ancient Philosophy
- Angus Johnston, Professor of Law
- Michael Johnston, Professor of Physics
- Jane Kaye, Professor of Health, Law and Policy
- Stephen Kearsey, Professor of Cell Biology
- Neil Kenny, Professor of French
- Benedikt Kessler, Professor of Biochemistry and Life Sciences Mass Spectrometry
- Robert Klose, Professor of Cell and Molecular Biology
- Marian Knight, Professor of Maternal and Child Population Health
- Julian Knight, Professor of Geonomic Medicine
- Tim Lancaster, Professor of Primary Health Care
- Martin Landray, Professor of Medicine and Epidemiology
- Trudie Lang, Professor of Global Health Research
- Chris Lavy, Professor of Tropical Orthopaedic Surgery
- Rhodri Lewis, Professor of English Literature
- Owen Lewis, Professor of Ecology
- Jane Lucy Lightfoot, Professor of Greek Literature
- Christopher Lintott, Professor of Astrophysics
- Adriaan Louis, Professor of Theoretical Physics
- Conall Mac Niocaill, Professor of Earth Sciences
- Peter McCulloch, Professor of Surgical Science and Practice
- Peter McDonald, Professor of British and Irish Poetry
- Rose McGready, Professor of Tropical Maternal and Child Health
- Fiona Macintosh, Professor of Classical Reception
- Stuart Mackenzie, Professor of Chemistry
- Peter Magill, Professor of Neurobiology
- William Mander, Professor of History of Modern Philosophy
- Jonathan Marchini, Professor of Statistics
- Andrew Martin, Professor of Systems Security
- Tamsin Mather, Professor of Earth Sciences
- Christopher Melchert, Professor of Arabic and Islamic Studies
- Kim Midwood, Professor of Matrix Biology
- Karla Miller, Professor of Biomedical Engineering
- Peter Mirfield, Professor of the Law of Evidence
- Llewelyn Morgan, Professor of Classical Languages and Literature.
- Teresa Morgan, Professor of Graeco-Roman History
- Boris Motik, Professor of Computer Science
- Shona Murphy, Professor of Molecular Genetics
- Victoria Murphy, Professor of Applied Linguistics
- Paul Newton, Professor of Tropical Medicine
- Bent Nielsen, Professor of Econometrics
- Heather O'Donoghue, Professor of Old Norse
- Colin O'Halloran, Professor of Computer Science
- Michael O'Hanlon, Professor of Museum Anthropology
- Ray Owens, Professor of Molecular Biology
- Deborah Oxley, Professor of Social Science History
- Sarah Parish, Professor of Medical Statistics and Epidemiology
- Laura Peers, Professor of Museum Anthropology
- Rafael Perera-Salazar, Professor of Medical Statistics
- Seamus Perry, Professor of English Literature
- John Pitcher, Professor of English Literature
- Tommaso Pizzari, Professor of Evolutionary Biology
- Mason Porter, Professor of Nonlinear and Complex Systems
- Eduardo Posada-Carbó, Professor of the History and Politics of Latin America
- Thomas Povey, Professor of Engineering Science
- David Priestland, Professor of Modern History
- Diane Purkiss, Professor of English Literature
- Zhongmin Qian, Professor of Mathematics
- Maria Quigley, Professor of Statistical Epidemiology
- Mike Rayner, Professor of Population Health
- David Rechter, Professor of Modern Jewish History
- Jonathan Rees, Professor of Orthopaedic Surgery and Musculoskeletal Science
- Owen Rees, Professor of Music
- Gillian Reeves, Professor of Statistical Epidemiology
- Matthew Reynolds, Professor of English and Comparative Criticism
- Dimitra Rigopoulou, Professor of Astrophysics
- Jens Rittscher, Professor of Engineering Science
- Blanca Rodriguez, Professor of Computational Medicine
- Timothy Rood, Professor of Greek Literature
- Richard Rutherford, Professor of Greek and Latin Literature
- Gwendolyn Sasse, Professor of Comparative Politics
- Gaia Scerif, Professor of Developmental Cognitive Neuroscience
- Alexander Schekochihin, Professor of Theoretical Physics
- Julia Schnabel, Professor of Engineering Science
- Alison Shaw, Professor of Social Anthropology
- Nicola Sibson, Professor of Imaging Neuroscience
- Alison Simmons, Professor of Gastroenterology
- Lesley Smith, Professor of Medieval Intellectual History
- Philip Stier, Professor of Atmospheric Physics
- Eleanor Stride, Professor of Engineering Science
- David Stuckler, Professor of Political Economy and Sociology
- Lee Sweetlove, Professor of Plant Sciences
- Balazs Szendroi, Professor of Pure Mathematics
- Graham Taylor, Professor of Mathematical Biology
- Jonathan Thacker, Professor of Spanish Golden Age Literature
- Guy Thwaites, Professor of Infectious Diseases
- Christiane Timmel, Professor of Chemistry
- Stephen Tuck, Professor of Modern History
- Claire Vallance, Professor of Physical Chemistry
- Ann Sarah Walker, Professor of Medical Statistics and Epidemiology
- David Wallace, Professor of Philosophy of Physics
- Bryan Ward-Perkins, Professor of Late Antique History
- Jamie Warner, Professor of Materials
- Sarah Waters, Professor of Applied Mathematics
- Andrew Wathen, Professor of Computational Mathematics
- Kate Watkins, Professor of Cognitive Neuroscience
- John Watts, Professor of Later Medieval History
- Tony Weidberg, Professor of Physics
- Joanna Weinberg, Professor of Early Modern Jewish History and Rabbinics
- William Whyte, Professor of Social and Architectural History
- Giles Wiggs, Professor of Aeolian Geomorphology
- Wes Williams, Professor of French Literature
- Abigail Williams, Professor of Eighteenth-Century English Literature
- Bridget Wills, Professor of Tropical Medicine
- Mark Wilson, Professor of Chemistry
- Dariusz Wojcik, Professor of Economic Geography
- Hongseok Yang, Professor of Computer Science
- Nick Yeung, Professor of Cognitive Neuroscience
- Zhong You, Professor of Engineering Science
- Duncan Young, Professor of Intensive Care Medicine
- Johannes Zachhuber, Professor of Historical and Systematic Theology
- Oliver Zimmer, Professor of Modern European History

== 2012 ==
The following were awarded the title of Professor by the University in January 2012, back-dated to the 2010–11 academic year:

- Sharon Achinstein, Professor of Renaissance Literature
- Christopher Adam, Professor of Development Economics
- Simon Aldridge, Professor of Main Group Chemistry
- Nigel Arden, Professor of Rheumatic Diseases
- Alison Banham, Professor of Haemato-oncology
- David Bannerman, Professor of Behavioural Neuroscience
- Adrian Banning, Professor of Interventional Cardiology
- Andrew Barry, Professor of Political Geography
- David Beard, Professor of Musculoskeletal Science
- Jim Bennett, Professor of the History of Science
- Ben Berks, Professor of Biochemistry
- Guido Bonsaver, Professor of Italian Cultural History
- Chas Bountra, Professor of Translational Medicine
- Paul Bowness, Professor of Experimental Rheumatology
- Jo Boyden, Professor of International Development
- David Bradshaw, Professor of English Literature
- Paul Brand, Professor of English Legal History
- Michael Broers, Professor of Western European History
- Michael Burden, Professor of Opera Studies
- Martin Castell, Professor of Materials
- Dawn Chatty, Professor of Anthropology and Forced Migration
- Robin Choudhury, Professor of Cardiovascular Medicine
- Patricia Clavin, Professor of International History
- S P Cobbold, MA Oxf, PhD Camb: Professor of Cellular Immunology
- B Coecke, Licentiaat PhD Brussels, Fellow of Wolfson: Professor of Quantum Foundations, Logics and Structures
- Z Cooper, BA Cape Town, DPhil Oxf: Professor of Clinical Psychology
- G B Dalton, MA DPhil Oxf, Fellow of St Cross: Professor of Astrophysics
- A Dancer, BA DPhil Oxf, Fellow of Jesus: Professor of Mathematics
- Anne Davies, Professor of Law and Public Policy
- C M Deane, MA Oxf, PhD Camb, Fellow of Kellogg: Professor of Structural Bioinformatics
- A M Dondorp, PhD Amsterdam: Professor of Tropical Medicine
- N J Emptage, BSc UEA, PhD Camb, Fellow of Lincoln: Professor of Neuropharmacology
- M C English, MB BChir MA MD Camb: Professor of International Child Health
- R W Field, MA MEng PhD Camb, Fellow of Balliol: Professor of Engineering Science
- E Fodor, MSc Bratislava, DPhil Oxf, Fellow of Linacre: Professor of Virology
- S Gardner, BCL MA Oxf, Fellow of Lincoln: Professor of Law
- Joshua Getzler, Professor of Law and Legal History
- J Gibbons, BSc Edin, DPhil Oxf, Fellow of Kellogg: Professor of Computing
- R J Gibbons, BM BCh MA DPhil Oxf, Fellow of Green Templeton: Professor of Clinical Genetics
- S C Gilbert, BSc East Ang, PhD Hull: Professor of Vaccinology
- I A Goldin, BA BSc Cape Town, MSc LSE, DPhil Oxf, AMP INSEAD, Fellow of Balliol: Professor of Globalisation and Development
- D R Greaves, BSc Brist, PhD Lond, Fellow of Hertford: Professor of Inflammation Biology
- N Grobert, DPhil Sus, Fellow of Corpus Christi: Professor of Nanomaterials
- L J Gullifer, BCL MA Oxf, Fellow of Harris Manchester: Professor of Commercial Law
- V Halbach, MA PhD Munich, Habil Konstanz, Fellow of New College: Professor of Philosophy
- T Hanke, BSc MSc McMaster, PhD St And: Professor of Vaccine Immunology
- C J Harmer, BSc DPhil York, Fellow of Corpus Christi: Professor of Cognitive Neuroscience
- R Harris, BA MA Pennsylvania, MA DPhil Oxf, Fellow of New College: Professor of Modern History
- A B Hassan, BSc Lond, BM BCh DPhil Oxf, FRCP, Fellow of Lincoln: Professor of Medical Oncology
- A B Hawkins, BA R’dg, PhD Lond, Fellow of Kellogg: Professor of History
- A E Henke, DPhil Oxf, Dipl Heidelberg, Fellow of Pembroke: Professor of Mathematics
- J J W Herring, BCL MA Oxf, Fellow of Exeter: Professor of Law
- L M Herz, PhD Camb, Dipl Bonn, Fellow of Brasenose: Professor of Physics
- T T Hien, PhD Open, MD Saigon, FRCP: Professor of Tropical Medicine
- Thomas Higham, BA MA Otago, DPhil Waikato, Fellow of Keble: Professor of Archaeological Science
- E A Holmes, BA Oxf, PhD Camb, DClinPsy Lond: Professor of Clinical Psychology
- S C P Horobin, BA PhD Sheff, Fellow of Magdalen: Professor of English Language and Literature
- R G Hoyland, MA DPhil Oxf, Fellow of St Cross: Professor of Islamic History
- C E Hoyle, BA Kent, MSc DPhil Oxf, Fellow of Green Templeton: Professor of Criminology
- E L Hsu, MPhil PhD Camb, PD Habil Heidelberg, Dipl Natwiss ETH Zurich, Fellow of Green Templeton: Professor of Anthropology
- P G J Irwin, MA DPhil Oxf, Fellow of St Anne's: Professor of Planetary Physics
- D H Jaksch, Mag PhD Innsbruck, Fellow of Keble: Professor of Physics
- Beata Javorcik, Professor of International Economics
- Heidi Johansen-Berg, Professor of Cognitive Neuroscience
- A S Kahn, BA Amherst, MA Harvard, MA DPhil Oxf, Fellow of St Edmund Hall: Professor of Russian Literature
- J Kristensen, MA PhD TU Denmark, Fellow of Magdalen: Professor of Mathematics
- D Kroening, PhD Saarland, Fellow of Magdalen: Professor of Computer Science
- Jennifer Kurinczuk, BSc MB ChB MD Leic, MSc Lond: Professor of Perinatal Epidemiology
- E E Leach, MMus Lond, MA DPhil Oxf, Fellow of St Hugh's: Professor of Music
- Thomas Lukasiewicz, Professor of Computer Science
- T.S. Maughan, MA MD Camb, MB BS Lond: Professor of Clinical Oncology
- P E McCullough, BA California, PhD Princeton, Fellow of Lincoln: Professor of English
- P D McDonald, BA MA Rhodes, DPhil Oxf, Fellow of St Hugh's: Professor of English and Related Literature
- H I McShane, BSc MB BS PhD Lond: Professor of Vaccinology
- G J Mallinson, MA PhD Camb, Fellow of Trinity: Professor of Early Modern French Literature
- L Miller, BSc Leic, PhD Camb: Professor of Astrophysics
- P J R Millican, BPhil MA Oxf, MSc PhD Leeds, Fellow of Hertford: Professor of Philosophy
- M G Moloney, BSc PhD Sydney, Fellow of St Peter's: Professor of Chemistry
- P Montgomery, BA Keele, MSc DPhil Oxf, Fellow of Green Templeton: Professor of Psycho-social Intervention
- P D Nellist, MA PhD Camb, Fellow of Corpus Christi: Professor of Materials
- M G New, BSc Cape Town, MPhil PhD Camb, Student of Christ Church: Professor of Climate Science
- P M Newman, MEng Oxf, PhD Sydney, Fellow of New College: Professor of Engineering Science
- C J Norbury, MA Oxf, PhD Lond, Fellow of Queen's: Professor of Molecular Pathology
- D C O'Brien, MA PhD Camb, Fellow of Balliol: Professor of Engineering Science
- C A O'Callaghan, BM BCh MA DPhil DM Oxf, FRCP, Fellow of Queen's: Professor of Medicine
- G S Ogg, BM BCh MA DPhil Oxf, Student of Christ Church: Professor of Dermatology
- J Ouaknine, BSc MSc McGill, DPhil Oxf, Fellow of St John's: Professor of Computer Science
- S D Palfrey, BA ANU, DPhil Oxf, Fellow of Brasenose: Professor of English Literature
- J Payne, MA Camb, Fellow of Merton: Professor of Corporate Finance Law
- W E Peel, BCL MA Oxf, Fellow of Keble: Professor of Law
- M D Petraglia, BA New York, MA PhD New Mexico, Fellow of Linacre: Professor of Human Evolution and Prehistory
- A J Price, MB BChir Lond, MA Camb, DPhil Oxf, FRCS(Orth)Eng, Fellow of Worcester: Professor of Orthopaedic Surgery
- R N Price, MB BChir MA Camb, FRCP, FRCPath, FRACP: Professor of Tropical Medicine
- C Redfield, BA Wellesley, MA PhD Harvard, Fellow of Wolfson: Professor of Molecular Biophysics
- I D Reid, BSc Western Australia, DPhil Oxf, Fellow of Exeter: Professor of Engineering Science
- R E M Rickaby, MA PhD Camb, Fellow of Wolfson: Professor of Biogeochemistry
- I S D Roberts, BSc MB ChB Manc, FRCPath, Student of Christ Church: Professor of Cellular Pathology
- J W H Schnupp, BSc Lond, BA Open, DPhil Oxf, Fellow of St Peter's: Professor of Neuroscience
- R C Schroeder, BA Williams College, MSc PhD Lond: Professor of Social Science of the Internet
- J A G Scott, BA Camb, BM BCh Oxf, MSc DTM&H Lond, FRCP: Professor of Epidemiology
- T Sharp, BSc Birm, PhD Nott, Fellow of University College: Professor of Neuropharmacology
- S Shepperd, BA Vermont, MSc Harvard, DPhil Oxf: Professor of Health Services Research
- C P Simmons, BSc PhD Melbourne: Professor of Infectious Diseases
- H W Small, BA Wellington, PhD Camb, Fellow of Pembroke: Professor of English Literature
- Nicholas Stargardt, BA PhD Camb, Fellow of Magdalen: Professor of Modern European History
- M D Stears, BA DPhil Oxf, Fellow of University College: Professor of Political Theory
- S Sturgeon, BA Texas, MA PhD Arizona, Fellow of Wadham: Professor of Philosophy
- R Thomas, MA Oxf, PhD Lond, Fellow of Balliol: Professor of Ancient Greek History
- R I Todd, MA Camb, DPhil Oxf, Fellow of St Catherine's: Professor of Materials
- K A Vallis, MB BS Lond, PhD Edin: Professor of Experimental Radiotherapeutics
- D J Vaux, BM BCh MA DPhil Oxf, Fellow of Lincoln: Professor of Cell Biology
- J Villar, MSc Guatemala, MPH Harvard, MD Rosario: Professor of Perinatal Medicine
- P Vyas, BA Camb, BM DPhil Oxf, Fellow of St Anne's: Professor of Haematology
- Bernd Wannenwetsch, Professor of Systematic Theology and Ethics
- R Washington, BA Natal, DPhil Oxf, Fellow of Keble: Professor of Climate Science
- D J Watson, MA Camb, PhD Pennsylvania, Fellow of Green Templeton: Professor of Higher Education
- T J G Whitmarsh, BA MPhil PhD Camb, Fellow of Corpus Christi: Professor of Ancient Literatures
- G R Wilkinson, BSc Lond, DPhil Oxf, Student of Christ Church: Professor of Physics
- T N Williams, MB BS PhD Lond, MRCP: Professor of Tropical Medicine
- P R Wilshaw, MA Camb, DPhil Oxf, Fellow of St Anne's: Professor of Materials
- T H Wilson, MPhil Lond, MA Oxf, Fellow of Balliol: Professor of the Arts of the Renaissance
- S L F Wollenberg, MA DPhil Oxf, Fellow of Lady Margaret Hall: Professor of Music
- C Wong, SB MIT, MA PhD Berkeley, Fellow of Lady Margaret Hall: Professor of Chinese Public Finance
- M J A Wood, BM BCh Cape Town, MA DPhil Oxf, Fellow of Somerville: Professor of Neuroscience
- J B Worrell, BA MSc DPhil Oxf, Fellow of Green Templeton: Professor of Computer Science
- V Worth-Stylianou, MA DPhil Oxf, Fellow of Trinity: Professor of French
- W C M Yip, BA Berkeley, PhD MIT: Professor of Health Policy and Economics
- Giulia Zanderighi, Professor of Physics
- Nicole Zitzmann, Professor of Virology

== 2008 ==
The following were awarded the title of Professor by the University in 2008:

- J.H. Alexander, Professor of Commonwealth Studies
- J.M. Armitage, Professor of Clinical Trials and Epidemiology
- R.M. Ballaster, Professor of Eighteenth Century Studies
- S.D. Biller, BA Michigan, MS PhD California, Fellow of Mansfield College: Professor of Particle Physics
- A. Blakeborough, MA PhD Camb, Fellow of Worcester College: Professor of Engineering Science
- K.M. Blundell, Professor of Astrophysics
- N. Bostrom, Professor of Applied Ethics
- C.D. Brewer, Professor of English Language and Literature
- N. Brockdorff, Professor of Biochemistry
- K.W. Burton, PhD Lond: Professor of Earth Sciences
- J. Cartwright, Professor of the Law of Contract
- H. Chapel, MA MD Camb, FRCP, F.R.C.Path., Fellow of Somerville College: Professor of Clinical Immunology
- J.S. Coleman, BA DPhil York, Fellow of Wolfson College: Professor of Phonetics
- M.J. Collins, MA DPhil Oxf, Fellow of University College: Professor of Mathematics
- A.M. Cooper-Sarkar, Professor of Particle Physics
- R.S. Crisp, Professor of Moral Philosophy
- D.W. M Crook, MB B.Ch. Witwatersrand: Professor of Microbiology
- R.J.O. Davies, BM DM S’ton, FRCP Lond, Fellow of Hertford College: Professor of Respiratory Medicine
- A.F. Deighton, Professor of European International Politics
- S.E. Dopson, BSc PhD Leic, MSc Lond, MA Oxf, Fellow of Green Templeton College: Professor of Organisational Behaviour
- S.S. Douglas-Scott, BA LL.M. Lond, Dip.Law City, Fellow of Lady Margaret Hall: Professor of European and Human Rights Law
- S.R. Duncan, MA Camb, MSc PhD Lond, Fellow of St Hugh's College: Professor of Engineering Science
- J.J. Edelman, Professor of the Law of Obligations
- D.F. Feeny, BA Oxf, MBA Harvard, Fellow of Green Templeton College: Professor of Information Management
- P. Ferreira, Professor of Astrophysics
- G.D. Flood, Professor of Hindu Studies and Comparative Religion
- B. Frellesvig, MA PhD Copenhagen, Fellow of Hertford College: Professor of Japanese Linguistics
- E.F. Garman, Professor of Molecular Biophysics
- C.R. Goding, BSc Leeds, PhD CNAA: Professor of Oncology
- V. Gouverneur, Professor of Chemistry
- C.A. Greenhalgh, BSc MSc Lond, MA Oxf, PhD Princeton: Fellow of St Peter's College: Professor of Applied Economics
- E. Higginbottom, MA PhD Camb, Fellow of New College: Professor of Choral Music
- I.M. Hook, MA PhD Camb, Student of Christ Church: Professor of Astrophysics
- S.M. Hooker, MA DPhil Oxf, Fellow of Merton College: Professor of Atomic and Laser Physics
- H.B. Hotson, Professor of Early Modern Intellectual History
- J. Hyman, Professor of Aesthetics
- H. Jones, F.Inst.P, C.Eng., C.Phys.: Professor of Condensed Matter Physics
- S. Knapp, PhD Karolinska Institute: Professor of Structural Biology
- K.M. Kohl, BA MA PhD Lond, MA CNAA, Fellow of Jesus College: Professor of German Literature
- S.M. Lea, Professor of Chemical Pathology
- K.J. Leeder, Professor of Modern German Literature
- I.S. Lemos, Professor of Classical Archaeology
- J.C. Lennox, Professor of Mathematics
- S.P. Llewelyn, BA PhD Sheff, MSc Leeds, Fellow of Harris Manchester College: Professor of Clinical Psychology
- G. Lowe, Professor of Computer Science
- A. Lukas, BSc Dipl Wuppertal, PhD Munich, Fellow of Balliol College: Professor of Theoretical Physics
- L.E. Maguire, BA PhD Lond, MA Birm, Shakespeare Institute, Fellow of Magdalen College: Professor of English Literature
- K. Mayhew, MSc Lond, MA Oxf: Professor of Education and Economic Performance
- P.R.A. McGuinness, Professor of French and Comparative Literature
- L. McNay, BA MA Sus, PhD Camb, Fellow of Somerville College: Professor of the Theory of Politics
- E.J.C. Mellor, BSc Manc, PhD R’dg, Fellow of Queen's College: Professor of Biochemistry
- R.S.R. Mitter, Professor of the History and Politics of Modern China
- S.J. Mulhall, Professor of Philosophy
- I.J. Neary, BA Sheff, DPhil Sus, Fellow of St Antony's College: Professor of the Politics of Japan
- K. Nicolaïdis, Professor of International Relations
- J.R. Ockendon, Professor of Mathematics
- U.C.T. Oppermann, BSc MSc PhD Marburg, Associate Professor, Karolinska Institute: Professor of Molecular Biology
- J. Pallot, Professor of the Human Geography of Russia
- F. Pezzella, MD Rome: Professor of Tumour Pathology
- A. Phelan, MA PhD Camb, MA Oxf, Fellow of Keble College: Professor of German Romantic Literature
- F.M. Platt, Professor of Biochemistry and Pharmacology
- A.J. Pollard, Professor of Paediatric Infection and Immunity
- D.M. Pyle, MA PhD Camb, Fellow of St Anne's College: Professor of Earth Sciences
- J. Radcliffe Richards, Professor of Practical Philosophy
- R.D. Rogers, BA MSc Lond, MA Oxf, PhD Camb, Fellow of Jesus College: Professor of Cognitive Neuroscience
- M.F.S. Rushworth, Professor of Cognitive Neuroscience
- S.W. Saunders, Professor of Philosophy of Physics
- R.L. Saxton, Professor of Composition
- L.M. Scott, Professor of Marketing
- M.P. Searle, Professor of Earth Sciences
- D.J. Siveter, BSc PhD Leic, Fellow of St Cross College: Professor of Earth Sciences
- F.J. Stafford, Professor of English Language and Literature
- T.P. Stern, Professor of Early Modern Drama
- M.J. Stevens, MA MSc M.Phil. DPhil Oxf, Fellow of Lincoln College: Professor of Economics
- J.M. Sykes, BA MA PhD Camb, Fellow of Mansfield College: Professor of Materials
- S.A.G. Talmon, Professor of Public International Law
- R.A. Taylor, MA DPhil Oxf, Fellow of Queen's College: Professor of Condensed Matter Physics
- N. Thatte, B.Tech. Bombay, MS PhD Berkeley, Fellow of Keble College: Professor of Astrophysics
- I.P. Thompson, BSc PhD Essex: Professor of Engineering Science
- C. Trifogli, Professor of Medieval Philosophy
- H.A. Viles, Professor of Biogeomorphology and Heritage Conservation
- A.M. Volfing, Professor of Medieval German Studies
- A. Watson, Professor of Mathematics Education
- S.M. Watt, BSc New England, PhD Melbourne: Professor of Haematology
- M.S. Williams, BSc PhD Brist, MA Oxf, Fellow of New College: Professor of Engineering Science
- G. Yassin, BSc MSc Hebrew University Jerusalem, PhD Keele, Fellow of Hertford College: Professor of Astrophysics

== 2006 ==
The following were awarded the title of Professor by the University in 2006:

- G. Abramson, MA, Fellow of St Cross College: Professor of Hebrew and Jewish Studies
- D.M. Anderson, MA, Fellow of St Cross College: Professor of African Politics
- C. Baigent, BM, B.Ch., MA, Fellow of Green College: Professor of Epidemiology
- A. Battacharya, Senior Research Fellow in Engineering and Continuing Education: Professor of Engineering Science with effect from 1 October 2006
- H. Becher: Professor of Cardiac Ultrasound
- E.K. Bikoff: Professor of Mammalian Genetics
- W.J. Blair, MA, Fellow of Queen's College: Professor of Medieval History and Archaeology
- A.T. Boothroyd, MA, Fellow of Oriel College: Professor of Physics
- S. Bright, BCL, MA, Fellow of New College: Professor of Land Law
- P. Brocklehurst, MA status: Professor of Perinatal Epidemiology
- M. Brouard, MA, Fellow of Jesus College: Professor of Chemistry
- H.R. Brown, MA, Fellow of Wolfson College: Professor of Philosophy of Physics
- A.H. Buchanan, MA, Fellow of St Hilda's College: Professor of Social Work
- C.P. Buckley, MA, DPhil, Fellow of Balliol College: Professor of Engineering Science
- J.V. Byrne, MA status: Professor of Neuroradiology
- J. Caplan, MA, DPhil, Fellow of St Antony's College: Professor of Modern European History
- R.D. Caplan, MA, Fellow of Linacre College: Professor of International Relations
- G. Capoccia, MA, Fellow of Corpus Christi College: Professor of Comparative Politics
- B. Casadei, MA status: Professor of Cardiovascular Medicine
- A. Cavalleri, Fellow of Merton College: Professor of Physics
- D.O.M. Charles, BPhil, MA, DPhil, Fellow of Oriel College: Professor of Philosophy
- Z. Chen: Professor of Epidemiology
- R.J. Cornall, BM, B.Ch., MA, DPhil, Fellow of Corpus Christi College: Professor of Immunology
- N. Cronk, MA, DPhil, Fellow of St Edmund Hall: Professor of French Literature
- J. Cross, MA, Student of Christ Church: Professor of Musicology
- M. Dalrymple, Fellow of Linacre College: Professor of Linguistics
- B.G. Davis, BA, DPhil, Fellow of Pembroke: Professor of Chemistry with effect from 10 May 2006
- S. Das, MA, Fellow of Exeter College: Professor of Earth Sciences
- J.W.M. Davies, MA, Fellow of Kellogg College: Professor of Software Engineeting
- N.P.J. Day, BM, B.Chi., DMr: Professor of Tropical Medicine
- L. Dreyfus, MA, Fellow of Magdalen College: Professor of Music
- F.P.E. Dunne, MA, Fellow of Hertford College: Professor of Engineering Science
- S.J. Elston, MA status, Fellow of St John's College: Professor of Engineering Science
- T.A.O. Endicott, MA status, M.Phil., DPhil, Fellow of Balliol College: Professor of Legal Philosophy
- F.H.L. Essler, MA, Fellow of Worcester College: Professor of Physics
- M. Fafchamps, MA, Fellow of Mansfield College: Professor of Development Economics
- J.C.T. Fairbank, MA Status: Professor of Spinal Surgery
- J. Farrar, DPhil: Professor of Tropical Medicine
- E.V.K. FitzGerald, MA, Fellow of St Antony's College: Professor of International Development
- E.V. Flynn, MA, Fellow of New College: Professor of Mathematics
- R. G. Foster: Professor of circadian Neuroscience
- J. Fox, Senior Research Fellow in the Department of Engineering Science: Professor of Engineering Science with effect from 1 January 2007
- D. Gaffan, MA: Professor of Behavioural Neuroscience
- D. Gauguier: Professor of Mammalian Genetics
- P.D. Giles, MA, DPhil, Fellow of Linacre College: Professor of American Literature
- M.H. Goldsmith, MA, DPhil, Fellow of Worcester College: Visiting Professor of Computing Science
- P.J.R. Goulder: Professor of Immunology
- K. Graddy, MA, Fellow of Exeter College: Professor of Applied Economics
- J.F. Gregg, MA, DPhil, Fellow of Magdalen College: Professor of Physics
- T.C. Guilford, MA, DPhil, Fellow of Merton College: Professor of Animal Behaviour
- S. Gupta, MA, Fellow of Linacre College: Professor of Theoretical Epidemiology
- H. Hamerow, MA, DPhil, Fellow of St Cross College: Professor of Archaeology
- M.W. Hankins: Professor of Visual Neuroscience
- C.K. Harley, MA, Fellow of St Antony's College: Professor of Economic History
- S. Harper, MA, DPhil, Fellow of Nuffield College: Professor of Gerontology
- M. Harrison, MA, DPhil, Fellow of Green College: Professor of the History of Medicine
- G.M. Henderson, MA, Fellow of University College: Professor of Earth Sciences
- S.P. Hesselbo, MA, Fellow of St Peter's College: Professor of Stratigraphy
- D.M. Hodgson, MA, Fellow of Oriel College: Professor of Chemistry
- J.C.N. Horder, BCL, MA, DPhil, Fellow of Worcester College: Professor of Criminal Law
- C.J. Howgego, MA, DPhil, Fellow of Wolfson College: Professor of Greek and Roman Numismatics
- W.S. James, MA, DPhil, Fellow of Brasenose College: Professor of Virology
- A. Jefferson, MA, DPhil, Fellow of New College: Professor of French Literature
- T.J. Jenkinson, MA, M.Phil., DPhil, Fellow of Keble College: Professor of Finance
- J. Johns, MA, DPhil, Fellow of Wolfson College: Professor of the Art and Archaeology of the Islamic Mediterranean
- J.A. Jones, MA, DPhil, Fellow of Brasenose College: Professor of Physics
- P. Kennedy, MA status, Fellow of Harris Manchester College: Professor of Clinical Psychology
- Y.F. Khong, MA, Fellow of Nuffield College: Professor of International Relations
- A.I. Kirkland, Fellow of Linacre: Professor of Materials (Image Analysis) with effect from 1 October 2005
- P. Klenerman, BM, B.Ch., DPhil, Fellow of Brasenose College: Professor of Immunology
- A.M. Korsunsky, MA, DPhil, Fellow of Trinity College: Professor of Engineering Science
- D. Kramkov, Professor of Mathematical Finance with effect from 1 January 2007
- H. Kraus, MA, Fellow of Corpus Christi College: Professor of Physics
- M. Lackenby, MA, DPhil, Fellow of St Catherine's College: Professor of Mathematics
- J.A. Langdale, MA, Fellow of Queen's College: Professor of Plant Development
- M. Leigh, MA, Fellow of St Anne's College: Professor of Classical Languages and Literature
- G.R. Lock, MA status, Fellow of Kellogg College: Professor of Archaeology
- E. Macaro, MA, Fellow of Worcester College: Professor of Applied Linguistics and Second Language Acquisition
- J. McDonagh, MA, Fellow of Linacre College: Professor of Victorian Literature
- G.A.T. McVean, MA, Fellow of Linacre: Professor of Statistical Genetics with effect from 1 October 2006
- J.A. Mee, MA, Fellow of University College: Professor of English Literature of the Romantic Period
- P. Mitchell, MA, DPhil, Fellow of St Hugh's College: Professor of African Archaeology
- R. Mott: Professor of Bioinformatics and Statistical Genetics
- P. Mountford, MA, DPhil, Fellow of St Edmund Hall: Professor of Chemistry
- L.C. Mugglestone, MA, DPhil, Fellow of Pembroke College: Professor of History of English
- K.A. Nation, Fellow of St John's College: Professor of Experimental Psychology
- A.C. Nobre, MA, Fellow of New College: Professor of Cognitive Neuroscience
- F. Nosten: Professor of Tropical Medicine
- R. Patient: Professor of Developmental Genetics
- P. Podsiadlowski, MA, Fellow of St Edmund Hall: Professor of Physics
- H.A. Priestley, MA, DPhil, Fellow of St Anne's College: Professor of Mathematics
- J. K.-H. Quah, MA, Fellow of St Hugh's College: Professor of Economic Theory
- C.B. Ramsey, MA, DPhil: Professor of Archaeological Science
- J.V. Roberts, Fellow of Worcester College: Professor of Criminology
- S.G. Roberts, MA, Fellow of St Edmund Hall: Professor of Materials
- E.J. Robertson, MA: Professor of Developmental Biology
- C.F. Robinson, MA, Fellow of Wolfson College: Professor of Islamic History
- P.F. Roche, MA status, Fellow of Hertford College: Professor of Physics
- F.D. Rueda, MA, Fellow of Merton College: Professor of Comparative Politics
- S. Sarkar, MA, Fellow of Linacre College: Professor of Physics
- D. Sarooshi, Fellow of Queen's College: Professor of Public International Law
- Q.J. Sattentau, MA, Fellow of Magdalen College: Professor of Immunology
- E. Savage-Smith, MA status, Fellow of St Cross College: Professor of the History of Islamic Science
- A.D. Scott, Fellow of Merton College: Professor of Mathematics
- C.J. Spence, MA, Fellow of Somerville College: Professor of Experimental Psychology
- C.R. Stone, MA, DPhil, Fellow of Somerville College: Professor of Engineering Science
- P.H. Taylor, MA, Fellow of Keble College: Professor of Engineering Science
- D.A. Terrar, MA, Fellow of Worcester College: Professor of Cardiac Electrophysiology
- A.L.R. Thomas, MA, Fellow of Lady Margaret Hall: Professor of Biomechanics
- M. Van De Mieroop, Fellow of Wolfson College: Professor of Assyriology
- F. Varese, MA, DPhil, Fellow of Linacre College: Professor of Criminology
- J. Welsh, M.Phil., MA, DPhil, Fellow of Somerville College: Professor of International Relations
- M.C. Whitby, MA status: Professor of Molecular Genetics
- S.D. Whitefield, MA, DPhil, Fellow of Pembroke: Professor of Comparative Russian and East European Politics and Societies with effect from 1 July 2006
- S.J. Whittaker, BCL, MA, DPhil, Fellow of St John's College: Professor of European Comparative Law
- K.J. Willis, MA, Fellow of Jesus College: Professor of Long-Term Ecology
- T. Witelski, Fellow-elect of St Catherine's: Professor of Applied Mathematics with effect from 1 August 2007
- J. Wright, MA, DPhil, Student of Christ Church: Professor of International Relations
- R. Zetter, MA, Fellow of Green College: Professor of Refugee Studies with effect from 1 October 2006
- J. Zielonka, MA, Fellow of St Antony's College: Professor of European Politics
- A.A.S. Zuckerman, MA, Fellow of University College: Professor of Civil Procedure

== 2004 ==
The following were awarded the title of Professor by the University in 2004:

- Dr H. L. Anderson, Keble College: Professor of Chemistry
- Dr D. G. Andrews, Lady Margaret Hall: Professor of Physics
- Mr T. Z. Aziz: Professor of Neurosurgery
- Dr R. N. E. Barton, Hertford College: Professor of Archaeology
- Dr D. M. W. Beeson: Professor of Neuroscience
- Dr S. Bhattacharya: Professor of Cardiovascular Medicine
- Dr R. Bicknell: Professor of Cancer Cell Biology
- Dr S. J. Blundell, Mansfield College: Professor of Physics
- Mr E. L. Bowie, Corpus Christi College: Professor of Classical Languages and Literature
- Mr A. Briggs, St Edmund Hall: Professor of Private International Law
- Dr M. Brown, St Peter's College: Professor of Musculoskeletal Science
- Mr M. J. Clarke: Professor of Clinical Epidemiology
- Dr S. J. Davis: Professor of Molecular Immunology
- Dr J. Day, Lady Margaret Hall: Professor of Old Testament Theology
- Dr T. J. Donohoe, Magdalen College: Professor of Chemistry
- Dr J. A. Endicott, St Cross College: Professor of Structural Biology
- Dr T. Enver: Professor of Molecular Haematology
- Dr M. Farrall, Keble College: Professor of Cardiovascular Genetics
- Dr P. R. Franklin, St Catherine's College: Professor of Music
- Dr L. Fugger: Professor of Clinical Immunology
- Mr T. Garton Ash, St Antony's College: Professor of European Studies
- Dr D. J. Gavaghan, New College: Professor of Computational Biology
- Mr G. Gibbs: Professor of Teaching and Learning in Higher Education
- Dr V. A. Gillespie, St Anne's College: Professor of English Language and Literature
- Dr P. Glasziou, Kellogg College: Professor of Evidence-based Medicine
- Dr C. H. Gosden, St Cross College: Professor of Archaeology
- Dr C. R. M. Grovenor, St Anne's College: Professor of Materials
- Professor K. Gull, Lincoln College: Professor of Molecular Microbiology
- Dr S. J. Gurr, Somerville College: Professor of Molecular Plant Pathology
- Dr P. A. Handford, St Catherine's College: Professor of Biochemistry
- Dr S. J. Harrison, Corpus Christi College: Professor of Classical Languages and Literature
- Dr K. O. Hawkins, Oriel College: Professor of Law and Society
- Dr K. J. Humphries, All Souls College: Professor of Economic History
- Dr P. T. Ireland, St Anne's College: Professor of Engineering Science
- Dr D. G. Jackson: Professor of Human Immunology
- Dr P. Jeavons, St Anne's College: Professor of Computer Science
- Dr A. Jephcoat: Visiting Professor of Earth Sciences
- Dr T. Key: Professor of Epidemiology
- Dr A. J. King, Merton College: Professor of Neurophysiology
- Dr D. W. Macdonald, Lady Margaret Hall: Professor of Wildlife Conservation
- Dr M. C. J. Maiden: Professor of Molecular Epidemiology
- Dr H. J. Mardon, St Catherine's College: Professor of Reproductive Science
- Mr N. J. Mayhew, St Cross College: Professor of Numismatics and Monetary History
- Dr D. J. McBarnet, Wolfson College: Professor of Socio-legal Studies
- Dr A. R. McLean, St Catherine's College: Professor of Mathematical Biology Dr T.F. Melham, Balliol College: Professor of Computer Science
- Dr A. W. Moore, St Hugh's College: Professor of Philosophy
- Dr M. F. Murphy: Professor of Blood Transfusion Medicine
- Dr H. A. W. Neil, Wolfson College: Professor of Clinical Epidemiology
- Dr L. A. Newlyn, St Edmund Hall: Professor of English Language and Literature
- Dr M. E. M. Noble: Professor of Structural Biology
- Mr M. W. J. Noble, Green College: Professor of Social Policy
- Dr D. Nowell, Christ Church Professor of Engineering Science
- Dr C. H. L. Ong, Merton College: Professor of Computer Science
- Dr M. J. Parker, St Cross College: Professor of Bioethics
- Dr F. Powrie: Professor of Immunology
- Dr S. G. Rawlings, St Peter's College: Professor of Physics
- Dr G. Reinert, Keble College: Professor of Statistics
- Dr P. B. Renton: Professor of Physics
- Dr S. J. Roberts, Somerville College: Professor of Information Engineering
- Dr M. A. Robinson: Professor of Environmental Archaeology
- Dr L. A. Roper, Balliol College: Professor of Early Modern History
- Dr P. M. Rothwell: Professor of Clinical Neurology
- Dr I. L. Sargent, Mansfield College: Professor of Reproductive Science
- Dr M. J. Smith, University College: Professor of Egyptology
- Dr D. K. Stammers: Professor of Structural Biology
- Dr E. Swyngedouw, St Peter's College: Professor of Geography
- Dr D. P. Taggart: Professor of Cardiovascular Surgery
- Dr S. Ulijaszek, St Cross College: Professor of Human Ecology
- Dr P. Wentworth: Professor of Medicinal Chemistry
- Dr R. K. Westbrook, St Hugh's College: Professor of Operations Management
- Dr R. J. Whittaker, St Edmund Hall: Professor of Biogeography
- Dr J. M. G. Williams: Professor of Clinical Psychology
- Dr J. S. Wilson: Professor of Mathematics
- Dr W. G. Wood: Professor of Haematology
- Dr D. Zancani, Balliol College: Professor of Italian

== 2002 ==
The following were awarded the title of Professor by the University in October 2002:

- Dr M. Airs, Kellogg College: Professor of Conservation and the Historic Environment
- Dr R.C. Allen, Nuffield College: Professor of Economic History
- Dr M.J. Banks, Wolfson College: Professor of Visual Anthropology
- Dr P. Battle, St Catherine's College: Professor of Chemistry
- Dr A.G.L. Borthwick, St Edmund Hall: Professor of Engineering Science
- Dr M.D. Brasier, St Edmund Hall: Professor of Palaeobiology
- Dr L.W.B. Brockliss, Magdalen College: Professor of Early Modern French History
- Dr L.R. Cardon: Professor of Bioinformatics
- Dr S. Castles, Green College: Professor of Migration and Refugee Studies
- Dr M. Ceadel, New College: Professor of Politics
- Dr A. Cerezo, Wolfson College: Professor of Materials
- Dr K. Channon, Lady Margaret Hall: Professor of Cardiovascular Medicine
- Ms M. Chevska, Brasenose College: Professor of Fine Art
- Dr K. Clarke: Professor of Physiological Biochemistry
- Dr D.A. Coleman: Professor of Demography
- Dr A. Cooper: Professor of Ancient Biomolecules
- Dr O. de Moor, Magdalen College: Professor of Computer Science
- Dr A.L. Dexter, Worcester College: Professor of Engineering Science
- Dr M. du Sautoy, All Souls College: Professor of Mathematics
- Professor M.J. Earl, Templeton College: Professor of Information Management
- Dr G.A. Evans, Nuffield College: Professor of the Sociology of Politics
- Dr E. Fallaize, St John's College: Professor of French
- Dr P.S. Fiddes, Regent's Park College: Professor of Systematic Theology
- Dr R.W. Fiddian, Wadham College: Professor of Spanish
- Dr J. Flint: Professor of Molecular Psychiatry
- Dr C.J. Foot, St Peter's College: Professor of Physics
- Dr S. Fuller: Professor of Macromolecular Structure and Assembly
- Dr A. Galione, New College: Professor of Pharmacology
- Dr D. Gambetta, All Souls College: Professor of Sociology
- Dr J. Geddes: Professor of Epidemiological Psychiatry
- Dr G.F. Gibbons: Professor of Human Metabolism
- Dr R.N. Gildea, Merton College: Professor of Modern French History
- Dr M. Goldacre, Magdalen College: Professor of Public Health
- Dr A.M. Gray: Professor of Health Economics
- Dr G.M. Griffiths: Professor of Experimental Pathology
- Dr N. Harnew, St Anne's College: Professor of Physics
- Dr M. Hewstone, New College: Professor of Social Psychology
- Dr P.J. Hore, Corpus Christi College: Professor of Chemistry
- Dr P.W. Jeffreys, Keble College: Professor of Computing
- Dr C. Jenkinson: Professor of Health Services Research
- Dr N.F. Johnson, Lincoln College: Professor of Physics
- Dr D.D. Joyce, Lincoln College: Professor of Mathematics
- Dr C. Kelly, New College: Professor of Russian
- Dr D.C. Kurtz, Wolfson College: Professor of Classical Art
- Dr D.R. Matthews, Harris Manchester College: Professor of Diabetic Medicine
- Dr R. McCabe, Merton College: Professor of English Language and Literature
- Dr R.C. Miall: Professor of Neuroscience
- Dr D. Miller, Nuffield College: Professor of Political Theory
- Dr S. Neubauer, Christ Church: Professor of Cardiovascular Medicine
- Dr J.A. Noble, Oriel College: Professor of Engineering Science
- Dr A.B. Parekh, Keble College: Professor of Physiology
- Dr B.E. Parsons, St Cross College: Professor of Geodesy and Geophysics
- Dr D.J. Paterson, Merton College: Professor of Cardiovascular Physiology
- Dr A.K. Petford-Long, Corpus Christi College: Professor of Materials
- Dr C.P. Ponting: Professor of Bioinformatics
- Dr J. Poulton, Lady Margaret Hall: Professor of Mitochondrial Genetics
- Dr C.W. Pugh, Green College: Professor of Renal Medicine
- Dr S.E. Randolph, Oriel College: Professor of Parasite Ecology
- Professor S. Rayner: Professor of Science in Society
- Dr P.L. Read, Trinity College: Professor of Physics
- Dr D. Roberts, Trinity College: Professor of Haematology
- Dr D.B. Robertson, St Hugh's College: Professor of Politics
- Dr J.W. Sear, Green College: Professor of Anaesthetics
- Dr R.J. Service, St Antony's College: Professor of Russian History
- Dr A.G. Sherratt, Linacre College: Professor of Archaeology
- Dr G.C. Sills, St Catherine's College: Professor of Engineering Science
- Dr T.P. Softley, Merton College: Professor of Chemical Physics
- Dr A.M. Steane, Exeter College: Professor of Physics
- Dr K. Sutherland, St Anne's College: Professor of Bibliography and Textual Criticism
- Mr C.C.W. Taylor, Corpus Christi College: Professor of Philosophy
- Dr A.J. Turberfield, Magdalen College: Professor of Physics
- Dr S. Vertovec, Linacre College: Professor of Transnational Anthropology
- Dr M. Vickers, Jesus College: Professor of Archaeology
- Dr R. Whittington, New College: Professor of Strategic Management
- Dr M.H. Worthington: Professor of Geophysics
- Dr D. Wu, St Catherine's College: Professor of English Language and Literature
- Dr J.M. Yeomans, St Hilda's College: Professor of Physics

== 2000 ==
The following were awarded the title of Professor in September 2000:

- T. Cavalier-Smith: Professor of Evolutionary Biology
- K.P. Day, MA, Fellow of Hertford College: Professor of Molecular Epidemiology
- L.C. Mahadevan, MA, Fellow of Trinity College: Professor of Biochemistry
- R.G. Ratcliffe, MA, DPhil, Fellow of New College: Professor of Plant Sciences
- A.J. Carr: Professor in Orthopaedic Surgery
- V. Cerundolo, MA, Fellow of Merton College: Professor of Immunology
- T.J. Elliott, MA: Professor in Immunology
- D.J.P. Ferguson, MA status: Professor of Ultrastructural Morphology
- D.W.R. Gray, MA, DPhil, Fellow of Oriel College: Professor of Experimental Surgery
- P.J. Harrison, DM, Fellow of Wolfson College: Professor of Psychiatry
- R.A. Hope, MA, Fellow of St Cross College: Professor of Medical Ethics
- N.J. Mortensen, MA status: Professor of Colorectal Surgery
- S.L. Rowland-Jones, MA, DPhil, Student of Christ Church: Professor of Immunology
- R.W. Snow: Professor of Tropical Public Health
- J.T. Triffitt, MA status: Professor of Bone Metabolism
- A.O.M. Wilkie, DM: Professor of Genetics
- D. Phillips, MA, DPhil, Fellow of St Edmund Hall: Professor of Comparative Education
- I. Walford, MA, M.Phil., Fellow of Green College: Professor of Education Policy
- I. Rivers, Fellow of St Hugh's College: Professor of English Language and Literature
- R.C. Griffiths, MA, Fellow of Lady Margaret Hall: Professor of Mathematical Genetics
- U. Tillmann, MA, Fellow of Merton College: Professor of Mathematics
- J.C.P. Woodcock, MA, Fellow of Kellogg College: Professor of Software Engineering
- A.M. Finch, MA, DPhil, Fellow of Merton College: Professor of French
- N. Ferguson, MA, DPhil, Fellow of Jesus College: Professor of Political and Financial History
- A.J. Nicholls, BPhil, MA, Fellow of St Antony's College: Professor of Modern German History
- J. Rawson, MA, DLitt, Fellow of Merton College: Professor of Chinese Art and Archaeology
- J.T. Chalker, MA, DPhil, Fellow of St Hugh's College: Professor of Physics
- R.C. Darton, Fellow of Hertford College: Professor of Engineering Science
- R.G. Edgell, MA, DPhil, Fellow of Trinity College: Professor of Inorganic Chemistry
- N.A. Jelley, MA, DPhil, Fellow of Lincoln College: Professor of Physics
- D.M.P. Mingos, MA, Fellow of St Edmund Hall: Professor of Chemistry
- J.S. Wark, MA, Fellow of Trinity College: Professor of Physics
- G. Hale: Professor of Therapeutic Immunology
- D.R. Moore: Professor of Auditory Neuroscience
- D.B. Sattelle: Professor of Molecular Neurobiology
- P.A. van der Merwe, MA, Fellow of Trinity College: Professor of Molecular Immunology
- R.M.A. Martin, MA, DPhil, Fellow of St Edmund Hall: Professor of Abnormal Psychology
- B.D. Catling, MA, Fellow of Linacre College: Professor of Fine Art
- D. Firth, MA, Fellow of Nuffield College: Professor of Social Statistics
- D.A. Vines, MA, DPhil, Fellow of Balliol College: Professor of Economics
- C.M. Tuckett, MA, Fellow of Wolfson College: Professor of New Testament Studies

== 1999 ==
The following were awarded the title of Professor in September 1999:

- K. Drickamer: Professor of Biochemistry
- A. Grafen, MA, DPhil, Fellow of St John's College: Professor of Theoretical Biology
- D.J. Rogers, MA, DPhil, Fellow of Green College: Professor of Ecology
- M.S.P. Sansom, MA, DPhil, Student of Christ Church: Professor of Molecular Biophysics
- J.M. Austyn, MA, DPhil, Fellow of Wolfson College: Professor of Immunobiology
- D.B. Dunger, MA status: Professor of Paediatric Endocrinology
- K.N. Frayn, MA status, Fellow of Green College: Professor of Human Metabolism
- A. Harris, MA, Fellow of St Cross College: Professor of Paediatric Molecular Genetics
- P.C. Harris: Professor of Medical Genetics
- I.D. Hickson: Professor of Molecular Oncology
- D.P. Jewell, BM, MA, DPhil, Fellow of Green College: Professor of Gastroenterology
- E.Y. Jones, MA, DPhil: Professor of Protein Crystallography
- H.J. McQuay, MA, DM, Fellow of Balliol College: Professor of Pain Relief
- D. Murray, MA status: Professor of Orthopaedic Surgery
- T.E.A. Peto, BM, MA, DPhil: Professor of Medicine
- P. Salkovskis, MA: Professor of Cognitive Psychology
- A.H.R.W. Simpson, MA, DM, Fellow of St Peter's College: Professor of Orthopaedic Surgery
- G. Stores, MA, Fellow of Linacre College: Professor of Child and Adolescent Psychiatry
- J.R. Stradling, MA status: Professor of Respiratory Medicine
- D.T. Wade, MA status: Professor of Neurological Disability
- A.E. Wakefield, MA, DPhil, Fellow of Merton College: Professor of Infectious Diseases
- F.T. Wojnarowska, BM, MA, MSc: Professor of Dermatology
- R. Hanna, MA, Fellow of Keble College: Professor of Palaeography
- R.J.C. Young, MA, DPhil, Fellow of Wadham College: Professor of English and Critical Theory
- S.D. Fredman, BCL, MA, Fellow of Exeter College: Professor of Law
- J.C. McCrudden, MA, DPhil, Fellow of Lincoln College: Professor of Human Rights Law
- R.H.A. Jenkyns, MA, MLitt, Fellow of Lady Margaret Hall: Professor of the Classical Tradition
- A.W. Lintott, MA, DLitt, Fellow of Worcester College: Professor of Roman History
- R.O.A.M. Lyne, MA, DPhil, Fellow of Balliol College: Professor of Classical Languages and Literature
- C.J.K. Batty, MA, MSc, DPhil, Fellow of St John's College: Professor of Analysis
- M.R. Bridson, MA, Fellow of Pembroke College: Professor of Topology
- E. Süli, MA, Fellow of Linacre: Professor of Numerical Analysis
- K.P. Tod, MA, MSc, DPhil, Fellow of St John's College: Professor of Mathematical Physics
- H.M. Brown, B. Litt., MA, Fellow of St Hilda's College: Professor of German
- C.M. Howells, MA, Fellow of Wadham College: Professor of French
- R.N.N. Robertson, MA, DPhil, Fellow of St John's College: Professor of German
- H. Watanabe-O'Kelly, MA, Fellow of Exeter College: Professor of German Literature
- P.A. Slack, MA, DPhil, Fellow of Linacre College: Professor of Early Modern Social History
- J.A. Caldwell, B.Mus., MA, DPhil: Professor of Music
- F.A. Armstrong, MA, Fellow of St John's College: Professor of Chemistry
- G.A.D. Briggs, MA, Fellow of Wolfson College: Professor of Materials
- R.W. Daniel, MA, Fellow of Brasenose College: Professor of Engineering Science
- J.S. Foord, MA, Fellow of St Catherine's College: Professor of Chemistry
- J.C. Green, MA, DPhil, Fellow of St Hugh's College: Professor of Chemistry
- B. Kouvaritakis, MA, Fellow of St Edmund Hall: Professor of Engineering Science
- M.L.G. Oldfield, MA, DPhil, Fellow of Keble College: Professor of Engineering Science
- C.V. Robinson, Fellow of Wolfson College: Professor of Chemistry
- A.P. Zisserman, MA status: Professor of Engineering Science
- D.V.M. Bishop, MA, DPhil: Professor of Developmental Neuropsychology
- S. Lall, BPhil, MA, Fellow of Green College: Professor of Development Economics
- N. Shephard, MA, Fellow of Nuffield College: Professor of Economics
- A.E. McGrath, MA, DPhil, Fellow of Wycliffe Hall: Professor of Historical Theology

== 1998 ==
The following were awarded the title of Professor in October 1998:

- S.J. Simpson, MA, Fellow of Jesus College: Professor of Entomology
- D.G. Altman: Professor of Statistics in Medicine
- W.O.C.M. Cookson, MA, Fellow of Green College: Professor of Genetics
- T.J. Crow: Professor of Psychiatry
- R.R. Holman, MA status: Professor of Diabetic Medicine
- R. Jacoby, MA, Fellow of Linacre College: Professor of Old Age Psychiatry
- D. Kwiatkowski, MA: Professor of Tropical Paediatrics
- P.M. Matthews, MA, MD, DPhil, Fellow of St Edmund Hall: Professor of Neurology
- K.R. Mills, MA, Fellow of Green College: Professor of Clinical Neurophysiology
- A.C. Vincent, MA, Fellow of Somerville College: Professor of Neuroimmunology
- J.S. Wainscoat, MA status: Professor of Haematology
- J.A.H. Wass, MA, Fellow of Green College: Professor of Endocrinology
- H.N.A. Willcox, MA status: Professor of Neurosciences
- B.P. Wordsworth, MA, Fellow of Green College: Professor of Rheumatology
- K. Sylva, MA, Fellow of Jesus College: Professor of Educational Psychology
- R. Bowlby, MA, Fellow of St Hilda's College: Professor of English Language and Literature
- M. Butler, MA, DPhil, Fellow of Exeter College: Professor of English Language and Literature
- K. Duncan-Jones, BLitt, MA, Fellow of Somerville College: Professor of English Language and Literature
- G.S. Goodwin-Gill, MA, DPhil, Fellow of Wolfson College: Professor of International Refugee Law
- A.M. Cameron, MA, Fellow of Keble College: Professor of Late Antique and Byzantine History
- G.O. Hutchinson, MA, DPhil, Fellow of Exeter College: Professor of Greek and Latin Languages and Literature
- G. Friesecke, MA, Fellow of St Catherine's College: Professor of Mathematics
- P.K. Maini, MA, DPhil, Fellow of Brasenose College: Professor of Mathematical Biology
- C.J.H. McDiarmid, MA, MSc, DPhil, Fellow of Corpus Christi College: Professor of Combinatorics
- R.A. Cooper, MA, DPhil, Fellow of Brasenose College: Professor of French
- P.R.J. Hainsworth, MA, Fellow of Lady Margaret Hall: Professor of Italian
- R. Sharpe, MA, Fellow of Wadham College: Professor of Diplomatic
- N.L. Stepan, MA: Professor of Modern History
- D.B. Abraham, MA, DSc, Fellow of Wolfson College: Professor of Statistical Mechanics
- R.W. Ainsworth, MA, DPhil, Fellow of St Catherine's College: Professor of Engineering Science
- P.D. Beer, MA, Fellow of Wadham College: Professor of Chemistry
- B.J. Bellhouse, MA, DPhil, Fellow of Magdalen College: Professor of Engineering Science
- J.R. Dilworth, MA, Fellow of St Anne's College: Professor of Chemistry
- D.J. Edwards, MA, Fellow of Wadham College: Professor of Engineering Science
- A.K. Ekert, MA, DPhil, Fellow of Merton College: Professor of Physics
- D.A. Hills, MA, Fellow of Lincoln College: Professor of Engineering Science
- B.J. Howard, MA, Fellow of Pembroke College: Professor of Chemistry
- C.J. Knowles: Professor of Engineering Science
- D.M. O'Hare, MA, DPhil, Fellow of Balliol College: Professor of Chemistry
- C.J. Schofield, MA, DPhil, Fellow of Hertford College: Professor of Chemistry
- A.N. Barclay, MA, DPhil: Professor of Molecular Immunology
- D.W. Mason, BM, MA status: Professor of Cellular Immunology
- P. Robbins, BM, MA, DPhil, Fellow of Queen's College: Professor of Physiology
- G. Claridge, MA, Fellow of Magdalen College: Professor of Abnormal Psychology
- P.L. Harris, MA, DPhil, Fellow of St John's College: Professor of Developmental Psychology
- K.R. Plunkett, MA, Fellow of St Hugh's College: Professor of Cognitive Neuroscience
- J.N.P. Rawlins, MA, DPhil, Fellow of University College: Professor of Behavioural Neuroscience
- P.A. David, MA, Fellow of All Souls College: Professor of Economics and Economic History
- B. Harriss-White, MA, Fellow of Wolfson College: Professor of Development Studies

== 1997 ==
The following were awarded the title of Professor in September 1997:

- C.G. Clarke, MA, DPhil, Fellow of Jesus: Professor of Urban and Social Geography
- D.A. Roe, MA, DLitt, Fellow of St Cross: Professor of Palaeolithic Archaeology
- N.H. Gale, MA, Fellow of Nuffield:Professor of Archaeological Science
- L.A. Casselton, MA, Fellow of St Cross: Professor of Fungal Genetics
- M.E.S. Dawkins, MA, DPhil, Fellow of Somerville: Professor of Animal Behaviour
- A. Kacelnik, MA, DPhil, Fellow of Pembroke: Professor of Behavioural Ecology
- S.M. Kingsman, MA, Fellow of Trinity: Professor of Molecular Genetics
- M.A. Nowak, MA, MA status, Fellow of Keble: Professor of Mathematical Biology
- P. Roy, Professor of Molecular Virology
- P. Styles, MA status, DPhil: Professor of Clinical Magnetic Resonance
- M.D. Yudkin, MA, DPhil, Fellow of Kellogg: Professor of Biochemistry
- C.J.K. Bulstrode, BM, MA, Fellow of Green College: Professor of Orthopaedic Surgery
- P.J. Cowen, MA status: Professor of Psychopharmacology
- S.C. Darby, MA status: Professor of Medical Statistics
- K.C. Gatter, BM, MA, DPhil, Fellow of St John's: Professor of Pathology
- C.E.W. Hahn, MA, DPhil, Fellow of Green College: Professor of Anaesthetic Science
- J.J. Harding, MA status: Professor of Ocular Biochemistry
- K. Marsh, Professor of Tropical Medicine
- J.C. Marshall, MA: Professor of Neuropsychology
- D.Y. Mason, DM, Fellow of Pembroke: Professor of Cellular Pathology
- R.A. Mayou, BM, MA, MSc, Fellow of Nuffield: Professor of Psychiatry
- A.P. Monaco, MA status: Professor of Human Genetics
- C.I. Newbold, MA, DPhil: Professor of Tropical Medicine
- N.N. Osborne, MA, Fellow of Green College: Professor of Ocular Neurobiology
- R.E. Phillips, MA, Fellow of Wolfson: Professor of Clinical Medicine
- B.C. Sykes, MA, Fellow of Wolfson: Professor of Human Genetics
- D. Tarin, MA, DM, Fellow of Green College: Professor of Pathology
- A.R. Wilkinson, MA status, Fellow of All Souls: Professor of Paediatrics
- I.C. Butler, MA, Student of Christ Church: Professor of English Language and Literature
- P.F. Cane, BCL, MA, Fellow of Corpus Christi: Professor of Law
- M. Giles, MA, Fellow of St Hugh's: Professor of Computational Fluid Dynamics
- A.W. Roscoe, MA, DPhil, Fellow of University College: Professor of Computing Science
- D. Segal, MA, Fellow of All Souls: Professor of Mathematics
- R.A.G. Pearson, MA, DPhil, Fellow of Queen's: Professor of French
- M. Biddle, MA, Fellow of Hertford: Professor of Medieval Archaeology
- R. Parker, MA, Fellow of St Hugh's: Professor of Music
- A. Jones, MA, Fellow of Pembroke: Professor of Classical Arabic
- D.L.T. Anderson, MA, Fellow of Wolfson: Professor of Physics
- J.H.D. Eland, MA, DPhil, Fellow of Worcester: Professor of Physical Chemistry
- P. Ewart, MA, Fellow of Worcester: Professor of Physics
- G.W.J. Fleet, MA, DPhil, Fellow of St John's: Professor of Chemistry
- D.W. Murray, MA, DPhil, Fellow of St Anne's: Professor of Engineering Science
- J.D. Silver, MA, DPhil, Fellow of New College: Professor of Physics
- A.P. Sutton, MA, Fellow of Linacre: Professor of Materials Science
- N.W. Tanner, MA, Fellow of Hertford: Professor of Physics
- A.M. Tsvelik, MA, Fellow of Brasenose: Professor of Physics
- J.P. Bolam, MA status: Professor of Anatomical Neuropharmacology
- J. Errington, MA, Fellow of Magdalen: Professor of Microbiology
- M.R. Matthews, BSc, MA, DM, Fellow of Lady Margaret Hall: Professor of Human Anatomy
- R.D. Vaughan-Jones, MA, Fellow of Exeter: Professor of Cellular Physiology
- N.P. Emler, MA, Fellow of Wolfson: Professor of Social Psychology
- R.E. Passingham, MA, Fellow of Wadham: Professor of Cognitive Neuroscience
- R.J. Foot, MA, Fellow of St Antony's: Professor of International Relations
- M.S. Freeden, MA status, DPhil, Fellow of Mansfield: Professor of Politics
- J.N.J. Muellbauer, MA, Fellow of Nuffield: Professor of Economics
- A.J. Ryan, MA, DLitt, Warden of New College: Professor of Politics
- D.N.J. MacCulloch, MA, DPhil, Fellow of St Cross: Professor of the History of the Church

== 1996 ==
The title of professor was conferred on the following in July 1996:

- I.J.R. Aitchison, MA, DPhil, Fellow of Worcester: Professor of Physics
- J.E. Allen, MA, DSc, Fellow of University: Professor of Engineering Science
- J.W. Allan, MA, DPhil, Fellow of St Cross: Professor of Eastern Art
- W.W.M. Allison, MA, DPhil, Fellow of Keble: Professor of Physics
- D.A. Allport, MA, Fellow of St Anne's: Professor of Experimental Psychology
- S. Anand, BPhil, MA, DPhil, Fellow of St Catherine's: Professor of Economics
- J.P. Armitage, MA, Fellow of St Hilda's: Professor of Biochemistry
- P.W. Atkins, MA, Fellow of Lincoln: Professor of Chemistry
- F.M. Ashcroft, MA, DPhil, Fellow of Trinity: Professor of Physiology
- C.C. Ashley, MA, DSc, Fellow of Corpus Christi: Professor of Physiology
- M.R. Ayers, MA, Fellow of Wadham: Professor of Philosophy
- M.O.L. Bacharach, MA, DPhil, Student of Christ Church: Professor of Economics
- J.M. Baker, MA, DPhil, Fellow of Merton: Professor of Physics
- R.H. Barnes, BLitt, MA, DPhil, Fellow of St Antony's: Professor of Social Anthropology
- V. Beral, MA, Fellow of Green College: Professor of Epidemiology
- J.J. Binney, MA, DPhil, Fellow of Merton: Professor of Physics
- R.S. Bird, MA, Fellow of Lincoln: Professor of Computing Science
- J.A. Blake, MA, Fellow of Exeter: Professor of Engineering Science
- V.B. Bogdanor, MA, Fellow of Brasenose: Professor of Politics
- A.F. Brading, MA, Fellow of Lady Margaret Hall: Professor of Pharmacology
- J.M. Brown, MA, Fellow of Exeter: Professor of Chemistry
- D.A.P. Bundy, MA, Fellow of Linacre: Professor of Zoology
- J. Burley, MA, Fellow of Green College: Professor of Forestry
- K. Burnett, MA, DPhil, Fellow of St John's: Professor of Physics
- J. Campbell, MA, Fellow of Worcester: Professor of Modern History
- J.L. Cardy, MA, Fellow of All Souls: Professor of Physics
- P.A. Charles, MA, Fellow of St Hugh's: Professor of Physics
- D.M. Clark, MA, DPhil, Fellow of University: Professor of Psychiatry
- J.B. Clegg, MA status: Professor of Molecular Medicine
- R.E. Collins, MA, MSc: Professor of Cardiology
- R.G. Compton, MA, DPhil, Fellow of St John's: Professor of Chemistry
- P.R. Cook, MA, DPhil, Fellow of Brasenose: Professor of Cell Biology
- E.H. Cooper, MA, Fellow of University: Professor of English Language and Literature
- I.W. Craig, MA, Fellow of St Catherine's: Professor of Genetics
- P.P. Craig, BCL, MA, Fellow of Worcester: Professor of Law
- R.J. Crampton, MA, Fellow of St Edmund Hall: Professor of East European History
- C.J. Crouch, MA, DPhil, Fellow of Trinity: Professor of Sociology
- V.D. Cunningham, MA, DPhil, Fellow of Corpus Christi: Professor of English Language and Literature
- M.K. Davies, BPhil, MA, DPhil, Fellow of Corpus Christi: Professor of Philosophy
- P.L. Davies, MA, Fellow of Balliol: Professor of Law
- S.G. Davies, MA, DPhil, Fellow of New College: Professor of Chemistry
- C.R. Dawkins, MA, DPhil, DSc, Fellow of New College: Professor of the Public Understanding of Science
- R.G. Denning, MA, DPhil, Fellow of Magdalen: Professor of Chemistry
- R.C.E. Devenish, MA, Fellow of Hertford: Professor of Physics
- D. Dew-Hughes, MA, DSc, Fellow of University: Professor of Engineering Science
- C.M. Dobson, MA, DPhil, Fellow of Lady Margaret Hall: Professor of Chemistry
- P.J. Dobson, MA, Fellow of Queen's: Professor of Engineering Science
- A.J. Downs, MA, DPhil, Fellow of Jesus: Professor of Chemistry
- K.G.H. Dyke, MA, Fellow of Wadham: Professor of Microbiology
- D.T. Edmonds, MA, DPhil, Fellow of Wadham: Professor of Physics
- J.C. Ellory, MA, Fellow of Corpus Christi: Professor of Physiology
- M.M. Esiri, DM, Fellow of St Hugh's: Professor of Neuropathology
- C.G. Fairburn, MA, DM: Professor of Psychiatry
- S.J. Ferguson, MA, DPhil, Fellow of St Edmund Hall: Professor of Biochemistry
- R.M. Fitzpatrick, MA, Fellow of Nuffield: Professor of R.M. Fitzpatrick
- G.H. Fowler, BM, MA, Fellow of Balliol: Professor of General Practice
- D.G. Fraser, MA, DPhil, Fellow of Worcester: Professor of Earth Sciences
- M.R. Freedland, MA, DPhil, Fellow of St John's: Professor of Law
- D.I.D. Gallie, MA, DPhil, Fellow of Nuffield: Professor of Sociology
- S.C. Gill, BPhil, MA, Fellow of Lincoln: Professor of English Language and Literature
- J.C. Gittins, MA, DSc, Fellow of Keble: Professor of Statistics
- A.M. Glazer, MA, Fellow of Jesus: Professor of Physics
- M.D. Goodman, MA, DPhil, Fellow of Wolfson: Professor of Jewish Studies
- M.J. Goringe, MA, DPhil, Fellow of Pembroke: Professor of Materials Science
- J.N. Gray, MA, DPhil, Fellow of Jesus: Professor of Politics
- S.A. Greenfield, MA, DPhil, Fellow of Lincoln: Professor of Pharmacology
- J.D. Gross, MA status: Professor of Biochemistry
- G. Hancock, MA, Fellow of Trinity: Professor of Chemistry
- J.F. Harris, MA, Fellow of St Catherine's: Professor of Modern History
- J.W. Harris, BCL, MA, Fellow of Keble: Professor of Law
- B.H. Harrison, MA, DPhil, Fellow of Corpus Christi: Professor of Modern History
- K.E. Hawton, DM, Fellow of Green College: Professor of Psychiatry
- R.G. Haydon, MA, Fellow of Brasenose: Professor of Mathematics
- A.F. Heath, MA, Fellow of Nuffield: Professor of Sociology
- R.E.M. Hedges, MA, DPhil, Fellow of St Cross: Professor of Archaeology
- J.A. Hiddleston, MA, Fellow of Exeter: Professor of French
- D.R. Higgs, MA status: Professor of Haematology
- A.V.S. Hill, MA, DPhil, DM, Fellow of Exeter: Professor of Human Genetics
- R.G. Hood, MA, DPhil, Fellow of All Souls: Professor of Criminology
- J.D. Hunt, MA, DPhil, Fellow of St Edmund Hall: Professor of Materials Science
- J.J.B. Jack, BM, MA, Fellow of University: Professor of Physiology
- W.R. James, BLitt, MA, DPhil, Fellow of St Cross: Professor of Social Anthropology
- C. Jordan, MA, Fellow of Somerville: Professor of Physics
- J.S. Kelly, MA, DPhil, Fellow of St John's: Professor of English Language and Literature
- W.J. Kennedy, MA, Fellow of Wolfson: Professor of Earth Sciences
- D.S. King, MA, Fellow of St John's: Professor of Politics
- A.J. Kingsman, MA, Fellow of St Catherine's: Professor of Biochemistry
- L.J. Kinlen, MA status, DPhil: Professor of Epidemiology
- F.C. Kirwan, MA, DPhil, Fellow of Balliol: Professor of Mathematics
- J.B. Knight, MA, Fellow of St Edmund Hall: Professor of Economics
- P. Langford, MA, DPhil, Fellow of Lincoln: Professor of Modern History
- G.M. Lathrop: Professor of Human Genetics
- J.E. Lewis, Fellow of All Souls: Professor of the History of Medicine
- D.E. Logan, MA, Fellow of Balliol: Professor of Chemistry
- P.A. Mackridge, MA, DPhil, Fellow of St Cross: Professor of Modern Greek
- I.W.F. Maclean, MA, DPhil, Fellow of Queen's: Professor of French
- P.A. Madden, MA, Fellow of Queen's: Professor of Chemistry
- W.F. McColl, MA, Fellow of Wadham: Professor of Computing Science
- K.A. McLauchlan, MA, Fellow of Hertford: Professor of Chemistry
- I.S. McLean, MA, DPhil, Fellow of Nuffield: Professor of Politics
- D.M. Metcalf, MA, DPhil, DLitt, Fellow of Wolfson: Professor of Numismatics
- J.F. Morris, MA, Fellow of St Hugh's: Professor of Human Anatomy
- G.M. Morriss-Kay, MA: Professor of Human Anatomy
- P.C. Newell, MA, DPhil, DSc, Fellow of St Peter's: Professor of Biochemistry
- E.A. Newsholme, MA, DSc, Fellow of Merton: Professor of Biochemistry
- R.J. Nicholas, MA, DPhil, Fellow of University: Professor of Physics
- P.A. Nuttall, MA, Fellow of Wolfson: Professor of Virology
- J.J. O'Connor, MA, Fellow of St Peter's: Professor of Engineering Science
- R.G. Osborne, MA, Fellow of Corpus Christi: Professor of Ancient History
- R. J. Parish, MA, DPhil, Fellow of St Catherine's: Professor of French
- A.J. Parker, MA, Fellow of St John's: Professor of Physiology
- M.B. Parkes, BLitt, MA, DLitt, Fellow of Keble: Professor of Palaeography
- V.H. Perry, MA, DPhil: Professor of Pharmacology
- J.B. Pethica, MA, Fellow of St Cross: Professor of Materials Science
- H.J.O. Pogge von Strandmann, MA, DPhil, Fellow of University: Professor of Modern History
- T. Powell, MA, Fellow of New College: Professor of Physiology
- N.J. Proudfoot, MA, Fellow of Brasenose: Professor of Experimental Pathology
- C.K. Prout, MA, DPhil, Fellow of Oriel: Professor of Chemistry
- P.J. Ratcliffe, MA status, Fellow of Jesus: Professor of Medicine
- L.D. Reynolds, MA, Fellow of Brasenose: Professor of Classical Languages and Literature
- V. Reynolds, MA, Fellow of Magdalen: Professor of Biological Anthropology
- P.G. Rivière, BLitt, MA, DPhil, Fellow of Linacre: Professor of Social Anthropology
- W.G. Richards, MA, DPhil, DSc, Fellow of Brasenose: Professor of Chemistry
- C.F. Robinson, MA, Student of Christ Church: Professor of European Literature
- B.J. Rogers, MA, Fellow of Lady Margaret Hall: Professor of Experimental Psychology
- E.T. Rolls, MA, DPhil, Fellow of Corpus Christi: Professor of Experimental Psychology Studies
- C. Ruiz, MA, Fellow of Exeter: Professor of Engineering Science
- J.F. Ryan, MA, Student of Christ Church: Professor of Physics
- R. W. Sheppard, MA, DPhil, Fellow of Magdalen: Professor of German
- A. Shlaim, MA, Fellow of St Antony's: Professor of International Relations
- E. Sim, MA status, DPhil, Fellow of St Peter's: Professor of Pharmacology
- G.D.W. Smith, MA, DPhil, Fellow of Trinity: Professor of Materials Science
- G.L. Smith, MA, Fellow of Wadham: Professor of Pathology
- J.A.C. Smith, MA, Fellow of Magdalen: Professor of Plant Sciences
- P.P. Somogyi, MA status: Professor of Pharmacology
- D.N. Stacey, MA, DPhil, Student of Christ Church: Professor of Physics
- J.F. Stein, BSc, BM, MA, Fellow of Magdalen: Professor of Physiology
- F.J. Stewart, MA, DPhil, Fellow of Somerville: Professor of Development Economics
- N.J. Stone, MA, DPhil, Fellow of St Edmund Hall: Professor of Physics
- O.P. Taplin, MA, DPhil, Fellow of Magdalen: Professor of Classical Languages and Literature
- J.A. Todd, MA status: Professor of Human Genetics
- R.C. Turner, MA, Fellow of Green College: Professor of Medicine
- M.A. Vaughan, MA, Fellow of Nuffield: Professor of Commonwealth
- M.R. Vaughan-Lee, MA, DPhil, Student of Christ Church: Professor of Mathematics
- A.J. Ware, MA, DPhil, Fellow of Worcester: Professor of Politics
- A. Watts, MA, Fellow of St Hugh's: Professor of Biochemistry
- R.P. Wayne, MA, Student of Christ Church: Professor of Chemistry
- A.J. Wilkie, MA, Fellow of Wolfson: Professor of Mathematical Logic
- M. Williams, MA, Fellow of Oriel: Professor of Geography
- T. Wilson, MA, DPhil, Fellow of Hertford: Professor of Engineering Science
- N.J. White, MA status: Professor of Tropical Medicine
- K.J. Wood, MA status, DPhil: Professor of Immunology
- J.F. Wordsworth, MA, Fellow of St Catherine's: Professor of English Language and Literature
- D.A. Wyatt, MA, Fellow of St Edmund Hall: Professor of Law
