= Ben Bollig =

English academic

Benjamin Alexander Francis Bollig is an academic specialising in Latin American literature and film. A lecturer at the University of Oxford since 2011, he was awarded the title of Professor of Spanish American Literature in 2016.

== Career ==
Bollig completed a Bachelor of Arts degree in Spanish and Portuguese at the University of Nottingham and then carried out his Master of Arts degree (on Latin American Cultural Studies) and doctorate at King's College London, completing a thesis on Argentine literature. After lecturing in London, he spent five years at the University of Leeds (2006–11) and was then elected a tutorial fellow in Spanish at St Catherine's College, Oxford, and as a faculty lecturer in Spanish American Literature. He is also an associate lecturer in Spanish at St John's College, Oxford. In 2016, the university awarded him with the title Professor of Spanish American Literature.

As of 2017, he is editor of the Journal of Latin American Cultural Studies.

== Research ==
Bollig's main research area is contemporary literature and film from Latin America, and his specialism is Argentine poetry. His published works include:

- Politics and Public Space in Contemporary Argentine Poetry: the Lyric and the State (New York: Palgrave Macmillan, 2016).
- "Argentine poetry today: new writing, new readings", Bulletin of Hispanic Studies, vol. 93, issue 6 (2016)
- (edited and translated) The Foreign Passion, Cristian Aliaga (London: Influx, 2016).
- (edited and translated with Alejandra Crosta) Antropófagos en las Islas. Novísimos Poetas de Gran Bretaña (Chubut, Arg.: Espacio Hudson, 2016).
- (edited) Studies in Spanish and Latin American Cinemas, vol. 11, issue 2 (special edition, 2014).
- Activismo Poético. Ensayos Sobre la Poesía Argentina Contemporánea (Chubut: Espacio Hudson, 2013).
- Modern Argentine Poetry: Displacement, Exile and Migration (University of Wales Press, 2011).
- (edited with Arturo Casas) Resistance and Emancipation: Cultural and Poetic Practices (Oxford and Bern: Peter Lang, 2011).
- Néstor Perlongher: The Poetic Search for an Argentine Marginal Voice, (University of Wales Press, 2008).
