= Jenny Taylor (scientist) =

British geneticist

- Born: Jenny Cameron Taylor
- Education: University of Oxford (BA, DPhil)
- Scientific career
- Fields: Translational genomics
- Workplaces: Weatherall Institute of Molecular Medicine; University of Oxford
- Thesis: Molecular interactions of P-glycoprotein (1997)
- Website: www.well.ox.ac.uk/people/jenny-taylor

Jenny Carmeron Taylor is a British geneticist who is Professor of Translational Genomics at the University of Oxford. Taylor is the Director of the Oxford Biomedical Research Centre Genetics Theme. Her research considers whole genome sequencing and ways to integrate genetic research into the National Health Service.

== Early life and education ==
Taylor was an undergraduate student at the St Edmund Hall, Oxford. She remained in Oxford for her doctoral research, joining the Weatherall Institute of Molecular Medicine.

== Research and career ==
After graduating she joined a start-up company focusing on the genetics of diseases. In 2002, Taylor moved to the Oxford Genetics Knowledge Park. She was Director of the Oxford Biomedical Research Centre Genetics Theme, which is supported by the Department of Health and Social Care. In this capacity, she oversees partnerships between researchers working in genetics and physicians in the National Health Service. In particular, she has developed novel ways to perform DNA sequencing. She hopes that these capabilities will be deployed across the health service, allowing for monitoring of the subtle changes in DNA that take place in various medical conditions. She worked in collaboration with Illumina to show that in whole genome sequencing could be used to diagnose patients with genetic disorders with a greater sensitivity than conventional genetic testing. These technologies – which can check 20,000 genes at the same as opposed to checking individual genes sequentially – offer hope for patients with rare diseases. Accurate diagnoses can enable physicians to select the correct medication or to set up the appropriate levels of support for people with learning disabilities. In 2013, she was elected a Fellow by special election at the University of Oxford.

In September 2023 Taylor was awarded a Title of Distinction of Professor of Translational Genomics by the University of Oxford.

=== Publications ===
Her publications include:

- A genome-wide association study of global gene expression
- Germline mutations affecting the proofreading domains of POLE and POLD1 predispose to colorectal adenomas and carcinomas
- Reassessment of Mendelian gene pathogenicity using 7,855 cardiomyopathy cases and 60,706 reference samples
