= Andrea Ruggeri =

Italian international relations scholar (born 1982)

Andrea Ruggeri (born 1982) is an Italian international relations scholar. He has been Professor of Political Science and International Relations at the University of Oxford since 2019, and a fellow in politics at Brasenose College, Oxford, since 2014.

== Career ==
Born in Savona in 1982, Ruggeri carried out his undergraduate studies at the University of Genoa, graduating with a BA in international and diplomatic sciences in 2005. In 2006, he completed an MA in international relations at the University of Essex, where he also carried out his doctoral studies supported by an Economic and Social Research Council (ESRC) studentship; his PhD was awarded in 2011 for his thesis "It depends: the spatial context of civil war". His PhD supervisor was Kristian Skrede Gleditsch.

In 2010, Ruggeri was appointed to an assistant professorship in international relations at the University of Amsterdam, there he carried out research thanks also to the support of the Independent Social Research Foundation. He spent four years there, then he was elected a fellow in politics at Brasenose College, Oxford, in 2014; he was simultaneously appointed associate professor of quantitative methods in international relations at the University of Oxford's Department of Politics and International Relations.

In 2019, Ruggeri was awarded the title of Professor of Political Science and International Relations. In 2019, Ruggeri was named as a co-investigator on an £895,000 research grant from the ESRC to explore "the consequences of United Nations peacekeeping withdrawal". He has created a Hub of Conflict, Peace and Security at the University of Oxford aiming "to serve as a platform for the international community of researchers and practitioners, enabling them to connect, learn from each other, and to collaborate in preventing or mitigating conflict, and shaping a more secure future".

In 2020, Ruggeri published with Vincenzo Bove and Chiara Ruffa a book for the Oxford University Press entitled "Composing Peace", the research for the book was funded by the Folke Bernadotte Academy, the British Academy and Swedish Research Council (Vetenskapsrådet).
