= Ash Asudeh =

Canadian linguist

Arshia Asudeh, known as Ash Asudeh, is a Canadian linguist specialising in semantics, syntax and cognitive science, and based at Carleton University and the University of Oxford; in 2016, the latter awarded him the title of Professor of Semantics.

== Life ==
Ash Asudeh graduated from Carleton University with a Bachelor of Arts degree in cognitive science in 1996, before completing a two-year MPhil at the University of Edinburgh with a thesis entitled Anaphora and argument structure: topics in the syntax and semantics of reflexives and reciprocals. Between 1998 and 2004, he completed a PhD at the Department of Linguistics at Stanford University, successfully defending a thesis on Resumption as resource management. For the following academic year, he lectured at the University of Canterbury, Christchurch; he was an assistant professor (2006–10) and then associate professor (since 2010) at Carleton University. In 2011, he took up a post as lecturer at the University of Oxford's Faculty of Linguistics, Philology and Phonetics, and joined Jesus College, Oxford, as a fellow. In 2016, the University of Oxford awarded him the title of Professor of Semantics.

== Research ==
Asudeh's research focuses on semantics, pragmatics, syntax, cognitive science, computational linguistics, language and logic. His published works include:

- Joan Bresnan, Ash Asudeh, Ida Toivonen, and Stephen Wechsler, Lexical-Functional Syntax, 2nd ed. (Wiley-Blackwell, 2016).
- Ash Asudeh and Ida Toivonen, "With Lexical Integrity", Theoretical Linguistics, vol. 40, issues 1–2 (2014), pp. 175–186.
- Ash Asudeh, Mary Dalrymple and Ida Toivonen, "Constructions with Lexical Integrity", Journal of Language Modelling, vol. 1, issue 1 (2013), pp. 1–54.
- Ash Asudeh and Ida Toivonen, "Copy raising and perception", Natural Language and Linguistic Theory, vol. 30, issue 2 (2012), pp. 321–380.
- Ash Asudeh, The Logic of Pronominal Resumption (Oxford University Press, 2012).
