= Amalia Coldea =

Romanian quantum physicist

Amalia Ioana Coldea
- Education: University of Oxford; University of Bristol
- Scientific career
- Workplaces: Somerville College, Oxford
- Thesis: An investigation of manganites exhibiting colossal magnetoresistance. (2001)

Amalia Ioana Coldea is a Romanian quantum physicist who is Professor of Physics at the University of Oxford. She was awarded the 2019 Institute of Physics Brian Pippard Prize and the 2011 EuroMagnet Prize.

== Early life and education ==
Coldea was born in Transylvania, Romania. She completed her undergraduate studies in the Babeș-Bolyai University, Cluj-Napoca. She was a doctoral student at the University of Oxford. As a graduate student she was based at The Queen's College. She was involved with various strategic committees focused on accessing high magnetic fields across Europe. Her doctoral research considered manganites that exhibit colossal magnetoresistance. After completing her doctorate, she was appointed a postdoctoral research fellow.

== Research and career ==
Coldea started her independent career at the University of Bristol in 2005. She was awarded a Royal Society Dorothy Hodgkin Fellowship. She returned to the University of Oxford in 2010. At Oxford, Coldea is part of the Centre for Applied Superconductivity and Fellow of Somerville College. She was awarded an Engineering and Physical Sciences Research Council Career Acceleration Fellowship. Her early work considers topological insulators, novel materials with strong spin-orbit coupling. Such materials are insulators in the bulk but have protected metallic surfaces, on which electrons cannot backscatter and outstanding transport mobilities are observed. In an effort to realise high performance next-generation devices, Coldea makes use of nanoscale tools to study topological insulators in low dimensional nanostructures.

Coldea leads research in quantum materials at the University of Oxford. She is particularly interested in superconductivity, a state of matter in which conduction electrons become correlated with one another and electrical resistance vanishes. She monitors quantum oscillations directly at the Fermi surface of these superconductors, as well as studying metallic systems. Her research has focussed on unconventional semiconductors based on iron. Superconductivity is a surprising observation in iron, as its strong ferromagnetism was expected to destroy any coherent electronic state. It has been proposed that superconductivity originates from nematic electronic states. These states break rotational symmetry, which gives rise to a distorted Fermi surfaces and anisotropic transport properties. She is interested in the use of high magnetic fields (up to 21 T) and cryogenic temperatures (down to 50 mK) to identify and study novel phases within quantum materials.

== Recognition ==
In 2019, Coldea was awarded the Institute of Physics Brian Pippard Prize.

She was named a Fellow of the American Physical Society in 2023 "for pioneering studies of the electronic structure and the nematic and superconducting orders of iron-based superconductors, using quantum oscillations, photoemission, and other techniques".

In September 2023 Coldea was awarded the Title of Distinction of Professor of Physics by the University of Oxford.

== Selected publications ==
- M. D. Watson; T. K. Kim; A. A. Haghighirad; N. R. Davies; A. McCollam; A. Narayanan; S. F. Blake; Y. L. Chen; S. Ghannadzade; A. J. Schofield; M. Hoesch; C. Meingast; T. Wolf; A. I. Coldea (7 April 2015). Emergence of the nematic electronic state in FeSe. OCLC 1201479988.
- Arjun Narayanan; Matthew D. Watson; S F Blake; et al. (19 March 2015). "Linear magnetoresistance caused by mobility fluctuations in n-doped Cd(3)As(2)". Physical Review Letters. 114 (11) 117201. arXiv:1412.4105. Bibcode:2015PhRvL.114k7201N. doi:10.1103/physrevlett.114.117201. ISSN 0031-9007. PMID 25839304. Wikidata Q51129264.
- Shishido H; Bangura AF; Amalia Coldea; et al. (5 February 2010). "Evolution of the Fermi Surface of BaFe2(As1−xPx)2 on Entering the Superconducting Dome". Physical Review Letters. 104 (5) 057008. arXiv:0910.3634. Bibcode:2010PhRvL.104e7008S. doi:10.1103/physrevlett.104.057008. ISSN 0031-9007. PMID 20366792. Wikidata Q57772966.
- M. D. Watson; T. Yamashita; S. Kasahara; et al. (10 July 2015). "Dichotomy between the Hole and Electron Behavior in Multiband Superconductor FeSe Probed by Ultrahigh Magnetic Fields". Physical Review Letters. 115 (2) 027006. arXiv:1502.02922. Bibcode:2015PhRvL.115b7006W. doi:10.1103/physrevlett.115.027006. ISSN 0031-9007. PMID 26207500. Wikidata Q85647586.

== Personal life ==
Coldea has two children.
