= Radu Aricescu =

Romanian-British molecular neuroscientist

Alexandru Radu Aricescu, known by his middle name, is a Romanian-British molecular neuroscientist based at the MRC Laboratory of Molecular Biology, Cambridge; Prior to 2017, he worked at the Wellcome Trust Centre for Human Genetics at the University of Oxford; in 2016 the University awarded him the title of Professor of Molecular Neuroscience.

== Career ==
Aricescu completed his undergraduate and Master of Sciences (MSc) studies in biology and molecular biology at the University of Bucharest. He was subsequently awarded a PhD in Developmental Neurobiology by University College London. In 2002, Aricescu worked at the Neural Development Unit in the University of London's Institute of Child Health. By 2006, he was part of the Cancer Research UK Receptor Structure Research Group in the Division of Structural Biology (STRUBI) at the University of Oxford's Wellcome Trust Centre for Human Genetics. Already a fellow at the Wellcome Trust Centre, in December 2010 he was appointed Senior Research Lecturer and in 2016 the University awarded him the title of Professor of Molecular Neuroscience. In 2017, Aricescu relocated to the Neurobiology Division of the MRC Laboratory of Molecular Biology, Cambridge, as a group leader.

== Research ==
Aricescu's research focuses on the molecular bases for way the brain acquires and stores information through learning and memory; more specifically, he has studied the "structural and functional characterisation of synaptic receptors". This has applications in understanding ageing, and a wide range of neurological and psychiatric problems. His recent publications include:

- "Structural basis for integration of GluD receptors within synaptic organizer complexes", Science, vol. 353, issue 6296 (2016).
- "Transsynaptic Modulation of Kainate Receptor Functions by C1q-like Proteins", Neuron, vol. 90, issue 4 (2016).
- "Crystal structure of a human GABAA receptor", Nature, vol. 512, issue 7514 (2014).
- "Structural basis for extracellular cis and trans RPTPσ signal competition in synaptogenesis", Nature Communications, issue 5 (2014).
- "Atomic-resolution monitoring of protein maturation in live human cells by NMR", Nature Chemical Biology, vol. 9, issue 5 (2013).
- "Proteoglycan-specific molecular switch for RPTPσ clustering and neuronal extension", Science, vol. 332, issue 6028 (2011).
