= Maia Chankseliani =

Academic background
- Education: Tbilisi State University, University of Cambridge, Harvard University

Academic work
- Institutions: University of Oxford

Maia Chankseliani is a Georgian-British educationalist and Professor of Comparative and International Education at the University of Oxford. She is also a Governing Body Fellow at St Edmund Hall.

== Early life and education ==
Born and raised in Tbilisi, Georgia, Chankseliani earned her Bachelor of Arts in English Philology from Tbilisi State University, a Master of Education in International Education Policy from Harvard University, and a Ph.D. in Education from the University of Cambridge.

== Career ==
Chankseliani has authored four books in comparative and international education: What Happened to the Soviet University? (2022), Building Research Capacity at Universities: Insights from Post-Soviet Countries (2022), Comparing Post-Socialist Transformations: Purposes, Policies, and Practices in Education (2018), and Fairness in Access to Higher Education in a Global Perspective: Reconciling Excellence, Efficiency, and Justice (2013).

Her research focuses on the tertiary education and development, examining societal, institutional, and policy forces that shape tertiary education and the potential of tertiary education and research for transforming societies. Her research aims to demonstrate how higher education contributes to the sustainable development goals, enhancing human development, knowledge generation, and skill enhancement. Her research into international student mobility reveals its significance for societal transformations in students' home countries. She currently leads a research project investigating the systemic effects of international mobility on poverty reduction, gender equality, health, education, justice and freedoms.

At Oxford, Chankseliani convenes the Comparative and International Education Research Group and leads a master's course in Comparative and International Education. She is the founder and convener of Global Public Seminars in Comparative and International Education.

Chankseliani serves as the Editor-in-Chief of the International Journal of Educational Research, and is on the editorial board of Higher Education.

== Awards and recognition ==
Chankseliani is Chair of the Higher Education SIG of the Comparative and International Education Society (CIES), serves on the Executive Committee of UK's Education and Development Forum (UKFIET), and is part of the College of Reviewers at the British Educational Research Association (BERA).
