= Madhavi Krishnan =

Madhavi Krishnan may refer to:

- Madhavi Krishnan (chemist)
- Madhavi Krishnan (dancer)
