= Byron Byrne =

Australian cricketer, academic

Personal information
- Full name: Byron Walter Byrne
- Born: 15 February 1972 (age 54); Sydney, New South Wales, Australia
- Batting: Right-handed
- Bowling: Right-arm off break

Domestic team information
- Years: Team
- 1997–2000: Oxford University
- 2000: Oxford Universities

Career statistics
| Competition | First-class |
|---|---|
| Matches | 27 |
| Runs scored | 1,048 |
| Batting average | 26.87 |
| 100s/50s | –/3 |
| Top score | 94 |
| Balls bowled | 2,239 |
| Wickets | 19 |
| Bowling average | 71.15 |
| 5 wickets in innings | – |
| 10 wickets in match | – |
| Best bowling | 3/69 |
| Catches/stumpings | 8/– |
- Source: Cricinfo, 23 May 2020

Byron Walter Byrne (born 15 February 1972) is an Australian academic and former first-class cricketer.

Byrne was born at Sydney in February 1972, but was raised in rural Western Australia. He was educated in Esperance at the Esperance Senior High School, before going up to the University of Western Australia where he studied civil engineering and commerce. He studied for his engineering doctorate in England at Balliol College at the University of Oxford as a Rhodes Scholar. While studying at Oxford, Byrne played first-class cricket for Oxford University, making his debut against Durham at Oxford in 1997. He played first-class cricket for Oxford until 2000, making a total of 26 appearances. As a batsman, he scored a total of 984 runs in these matches, at an average of 26.59 and with a high score of 94, which was one of three half centuries he made. With his right-arm off break bowling, he took 19 wickets with best figures of 3 for 66. In addition to playing for Oxford University, Byrne also made a single first-class appearance for a combined Oxford Universities team against Northamptonshire in 2000.

During his studies at Oxford, Byrne also lectured in engineering in addition to being a 'prize fellow' at Magdalen College. After completing his doctorate, he took up a departmental lecturership Magdalen College, before moving to St Catherine's College in 2005. Byrne was awarded the title of professor of engineering science by the university in 2014 and was awarded a Royal Academy of Engineering Research Chair in 2018. He is a director of Oxford Science Park. He was elected a Fellow of the Royal Academy of Engineering (FREng) in 2021.
