= Akane Kawamura =

British chemist and academic

- Education: University of Oxford
- Scientific career
- Workplaces: University of Oxford; Newcastle University
- Thesis: Structural investigations of arylamine N-acetyltransferases from eukaryotes (2005)
- Doctoral advisor: Edith Sim
- Other academic advisors: Christopher J. Schofield

Akane Kawamura is a Japanese chemist who is Professor of Chemical Biology at Newcastle University in the UK. Her research considers the chemistry of epigenetics. She was awarded the Royal Society of Chemistry Jeremy Knowles Award for her development of chemical probes to study biological processes.

== Early life and education ==
Kawamura was an undergraduate student in chemistry at the University of Oxford. She remained at Oxford for graduate research, where she worked alongside Edith Sim on structural investigations into eukaryotes. After completing her doctorate, she moved into the biotechnology sector, where she worked on drug discovery. She returned to academia in 2009, when she joined Christopher J. Schofield at Oxford and worked on the development of chemical probes.

== Research and career ==
In 2012, Kawamura was awarded a British Heart Foundation Centre of Research Excellence Senior Fellowship and a Royal Society Dorothy Hodgkin Fellowship. She was made a lecturer in 2016 and an associate professor in 2019. Her research considers epigenetics, with a focus on the methylation of DNA. She studies the enzymes and proteins that regulate methylation states.

In 2023, Kawamura was awarded the Royal Society of Chemistry's Jeremy Knowles Award for her work on the development of chemical probes to study biological processes.

== Selected publications ==
- Rasheduzzaman Chowdhury; Kar Kheng Yeoh; Ya-Min Tian; et al. (2011). "The oncometabolite 2-hydroxyglutarate inhibits histone lysine demethylases". EMBO Reports. 12 (5): 463–9. doi:10.1038/embor.2011.43. PMC 3090014. PMID 21460794. Wikidata Q27667409.
- Rose, Nathan; McDonough, Michael; King, Oliver; Kawamura, Akane; Schofield, Christopher (2011). "Inhibition of 2-oxoglutarate dependent oxygenases". Chemical Society Reviews. 40 (8): 4364–4397. doi:10.1039/c0cs00203h. PMID 21390379. Wikidata Q28306956.
- King, Oliver; Xuan Shirley Li; Masaaki Sakurai; et al. (2010). "Quantitative High-Throughput Screening Identifies 8-Hydroxyquinolines as Cell-Active Histone Demethylase Inhibitors". PLOS One. 5 (11) e15535. Bibcode:2010PLoSO...515535K. doi:10.1371/journal.pone.0015535. PMC 2990756. PMID 21124847. Wikidata Q27666155.
