= Aaron Reeves =

British academic (born 1982)

- Born: 1982 (age 43–44)
- Education: University of Essex
- Occupation: Sociologist
- Website: https://asreeves.github.io/

Aaron Reeves is a British academic and professor of Sociology at the London School of Economics (LSE), and Visiting Professor at the International Inequalities Institute, also based at LSE. He worked as professor of Sociology and Social Policy at the University of Oxford. His work has focused on the political economy of health inequalities and elites in Britain. He is the author, with Sam Friedman, of Born to Rule: The Making and Remaking of the British Elite.

== Publications ==
- Born to Rule: The Making and Remaking of the British Elite (Harvard University Press, 2024: with Sam Friedman)
- Ageing and Health: The Politics of Better Policies (Cambridge University Press, 2021: with Scott Greer, Julia Lynch, Clare Bambra, Jon Cylus, Jane Gingrich, and Michelle Falkenbach)
