= Bent Nielsen =

Bent Nielsen is a professorial fellow in economics at Nuffield College, University of Oxford. Nielsen has research interests in econometrics and financial economics: time series, outlier detection, and cohort analysis. Nielsen completed his Ph.D. at the University of Copenhagen.

== Selected publications ==
=== Books ===
- Hendry, David F.; Nielsen, Bent (2007). Econometric Modeling: A Likelihood Approach. Princeton University Press.

=== Papers ===
- Kuang, D.; Nielsen, B.; Nielsen, J. P. "The geometric chain-ladder". Scandinavian Actuarial Journal. 2015: 278–300. doi:10.1080/03461238.2013.821952.
- Nielsen, B.; Whitby, A. (2015). "A Joint Chow Test for Structural Instability". Econometrics. 3: 156–186. doi:10.3390/econometrics3010156. hdl:10419/171821.
- Martínez Miranda, M. D.; Nielsen, B.; Nielsen, J. P. (2015). "Inference and forecasting in the age-period-cohort model with unknown exposure with an application to mesothelioma mortality". Journal of the Royal Statistical Society. Series A. 178: 29–55. doi:10.1111/rssa.12051.
- Nielsen, B.; Nielsen, J. P. (2014). "Identification and forecasting in mortality models". The Scientific World Journal. 2014 347043. doi:10.1155/2014/347043. PMC 4060603.
