= Buchanan Medal =

Royal Society award for contributions to medical science

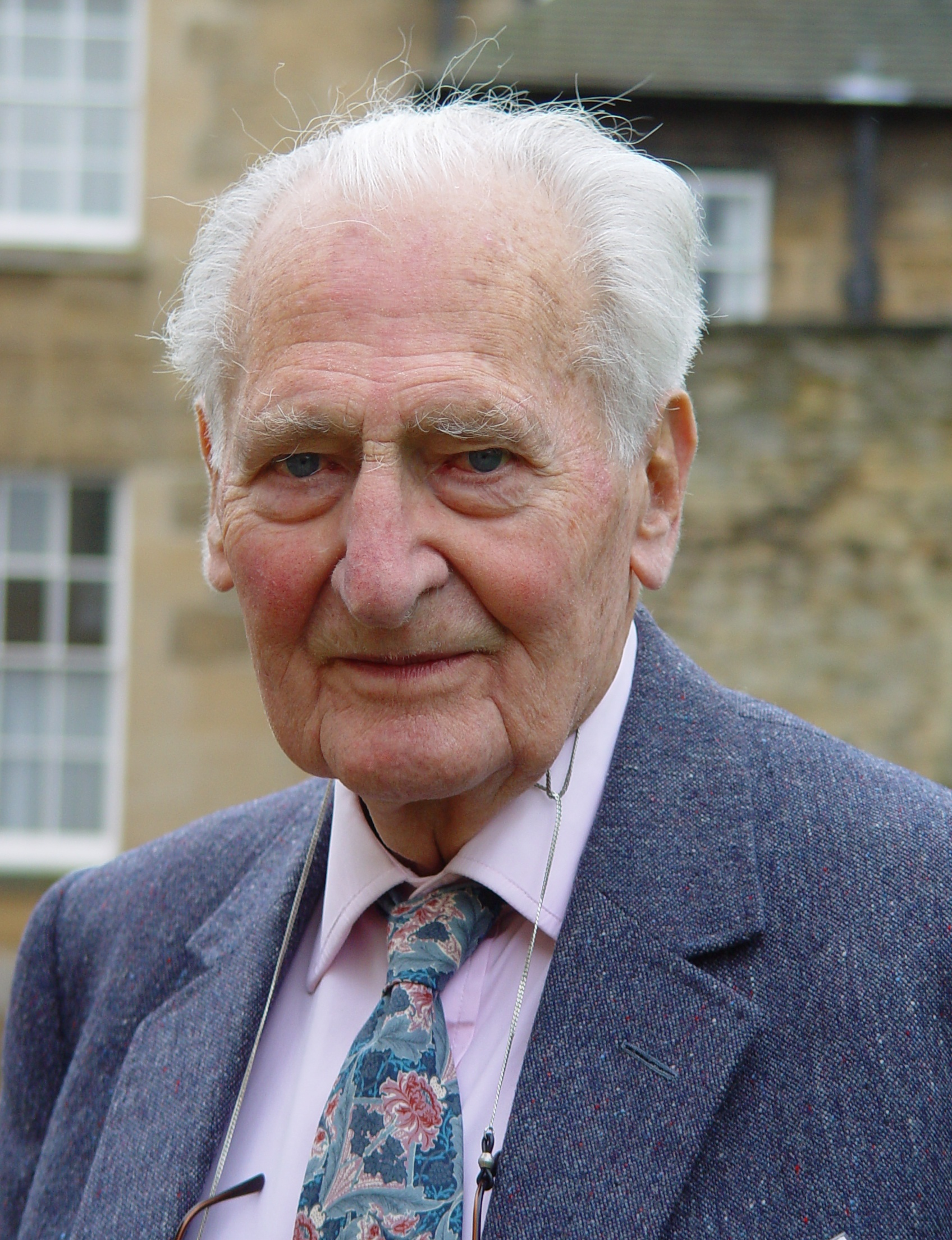
Richard Doll, who won the medal in 1972 "for his outstanding studies on the aetiology, prevention and treatment of disease, especially cancer"

The Buchanan Medal is awarded by the Royal Society "in recognition of distinguished contribution to the medical sciences generally". The award was created in 1897 from a fund to the memory of London physician Sir George Buchanan (1831–1895). It was to be awarded once every five years, but since 1990 the medal has been awarded every two years.

Since its creation, it has been awarded 28 times, and unlike other Royal Society medals such as the Royal Medal, it has never been awarded to the same individual multiple times. As a result of the criteria for the medal, most of the winners have been doctors or other medical professionals; an exception was Frederick Warner, an engineer who won the medal in 1982 "for his important role in reducing pollution of the River Thames and of his significant contributions to risk assessment".

Two winners have also won a Nobel Prize. The first, Barry Marshall, who was awarded the Buchanan Medal in 1998 "in recognition of his work on discovering the role of Helicobacter pylori as a cause of diseases such as duodenal ulcer, gastric ulcer, gastric cancer and gastritis-associated dyspepsia" and won the Nobel Prize in Physiology or Medicine in 2005. The second, Peter Ratcliffe, won the medal in 2017 "for his ground-breaking research on oxygen sensing and signalling pathways mediating cellular responses to hypoxia", and was awarded the Nobel Prize in 2019.

The first winner of the Buchanan Medal was John Simon, who won his medal in 1897 "for his distinguished services as an organizer of medical sanitary administration in this country, and as a promoter of scientific research relating to public health".

== List of recipients ==
Source: Royal Society

Year	Name	Rationale	Notes
1897	John Simon	"for his distinguished services as an organizer of medical sanitary administration in this country, and as a promoter of scientific research relating to public health"	
1902	Sydney Copeman	"for his experimental investigations into the bacteriology and comparative pathology of vaccination"	
1907	William Henry Power	"for his services to sanitary science"	
1912	William Crawford Gorgas	"for his sanitary administration of the works of the Panama Canal"	—
1917	Almroth Wright	"for his contributions to preventive medicine"	
1922	David Bruce	"for his researches and discoveries in tropical medicine"	
1927	Major Greenwood	"for his statistical researches and other work in relation to public health"	
1932	Thorvald Madsen	"for his very important theoretical and practical work on immunity, especially in relation to diphtheria antitoxin"	—
1937	Frederick Fuller Russell	"for his work in relation to public health problems in many parts of the world on behalf of the International Health Division of the Rockefeller Foundation"	—
1942	Wilson Jameson	"for his distinguished administrative service to hygienic science and practice"	
1947	Edward Mellanby	"for his distinguished researches on the physiology of nutrition, especially in relation to the causation of deficiency diseases"	
1952	Rickard Christophers	"for his outstanding research on malaria and on the Anopheles mosquitos [sic] which transmit that disease"	
1957	Neil Hamilton Fairley	"for his distinguished contributions to the control of malaria"	
1962	Landsborough Thomson	"for his long and distinguished services to the support and administration of medical and biological research"	
1967	Graham Wilson	"for his distinguished work on the medical aspects of bacteriology and immunity, and for the public health laboratory service of England and Wales"	
1972	Richard Doll	"for his outstanding studies on the aetiology, prevention and treatment of disease, especially cancer"	
1977	David Evans	"for his leading role in the standardization and safety control of vaccines"	
1982	Frederick Warner	"for his important role in reducing pollution of the River Thames and of his significant contributions to risk assessment"	
1987	Gyorgy Karoly Radda	"for his development of high resolution NMR spectroscopy for the study of cellular energetics and cellular enzymology, and for medical diagnosis, and of the insights and advances thereby gained"	—
1990	Cyril Clarke	"for his innovative studies on haemolytic disease of the newborn which culminated in new therapies leading to the elimination of this major fetal disease"	
1992	Denis Parsons Burkitt	"for his discovery of a lymphoma which bears his name"	
1994	Sir David Weatherall	"in recognition of his notable contributions, over many years, to the application of molecular genetics to human medicine, in particular elucidating the many forms of molecular pathology that may underlie thalassaemias, and for his leadership in promoting the application of molecular genetics to medicine in the UK, not least as Director of the Institute of Molecular Medicine in Oxford."	
1996	N.H. Ashton	"for his contribution to vision research and his most important achievement in his discovery of the role of oxygen in the pathogenesis of retrolental fibroplasia now known as retinopathy of prematurity, together with his studies of the mechanism of hypertensive retinopathy, studies of the pathology of diabetic retinopathy and amoebic infection of the eye"	
1998	Barry James Marshall	"in recognition of his work on discovering the role of Helicobacter pylori as a cause of diseases such as duodenal ulcer, gastric ulcer, gastric cancer and gastritis-associated dyspepsia"	
2000	William Stanley Peart	"for his contribution to the foundations of understanding of the renin angiotensin system in particular through his seminal work on the isolation and determination of the structure of angiotensin, purification of renin, and subsequent studies on the control of renin release"	—
2002	Michael Waterfield	"Michael Waterfield for his exceptional skill in protein biochemistry which have transformed our understanding of signal transduction, and the subversion of cellular signalling pathways in cancer"	—
2004	David P. Lane	"in recognition of his discovery of the p53 protein and the subsequent research in which this basic discovery has been followed through to clinical application, exploiting the p53 pathway to find new treatments for cancer"	—
2006	Iain MacIntyre	"for his many contributions to his field, ranging from the fundamental discoveries on the cellular origin and biochemical mode of the action of calcitonin to its application in clinical practice"	
2008	Christopher Marshall	"for his outstanding contribution to understanding the process whereby cancers develop and in the identification of major targets for their therapeutic treatment"	
2010	Peter Cresswell	"for his outstanding contributions to immunology, in particular to our understanding of the processing of foreign protein antigens within cells to stimulate T-cell immune responses".	
2011	Stephen Jackson	"for his outstanding contributions to understanding DNA repair and DNA-damage-response signalling pathways".	
2013	Douglas Higgs	"for his seminal work on the regulation of the human alpha-globin gene cluster and the role of the ATRX protein in genetic disease"	
2015	Irwin McLean	"for his major contribution to our understanding of the genetic basis of heritable skin diseases"	
2017	Peter Ratcliffe	"for his ground-breaking research on oxygen sensing and signalling pathways mediating cellular responses to hypoxia".	—
2018	Adrian Bird	"for his discovery that 5-methycytosine-binding MeCP2 protein silences transcription of methylated DNA and can reverse established Rett Syndrome in MeCP2 deficiency, the first demonstration that such neurodevelopmental diseases are curable."	—
2019	Gillian Griffiths	"for establishing the fundamental cell biological mechanisms that drive cytotoxic T-cell killing, laying the foundations for informed application of cancer immunotherapy."	—
2020	Douglass Turnbull	"for outstanding contributions to biomedicine particularly in relation to mitochondrial disease, including the development of a method to prevent their transmission."	—
2021	Anne Ferguson-Smith	"for her pioneering work in epigenetics, her interdisciplinary work on genomic imprinting, the interplay between the genome and epigenome, and how genetic and environmental influences affect development and human diseases."	—
2022	Edward Richard Moxon	"for helping pioneer the field of molecular microbiology; discovering contingency loci in bacteria that facilitate rapid evolution under selection and making key contributions to the development of meningitis vaccines."	—
2023	Hagan Bayley	"for founding Oxford Nanopore Technology, the hugely successful biotech company."	—
2024	Jane Visvader; Geoffrey Lindeman	"for their discoveries around breast stem and progenitor cells and using this knowledge to discover new approaches to breast cancer treatment and prevention."	—
2025	Rory Collins	"for leading practice altering cardiovascular clinical trials and leading UK Biobank."	—

== See also ==
- List of medicine awards
