= Suranjith =

Suranjith is a masculine given name found in Sri Lanka. Notable people with this name include:

- Suranjith Dharmasena (born 1965), a Sri Lankan cricket player
- Suranjith Seneviratne, a Sri Lankan doctor
- Suranjith Silva (born 1975), a Sri Lankan former cricketer
