= John Bell (physician) =

Canadian immunologist and geneticist (born 1952)

Sir John Bell GBE CH FRS FMedSci
- Born: John Irving Bell; 1 July 1952 (age 73); Edmonton, Alberta, Canada
- Citizenship: Canadian, British
- Education: University of Alberta (BMedSci); Magdalen College, Oxford (BA BMBCh)
- Scientific career
- Fields: Immunology, genetics
- Website: https://www.medsci.ox.ac.uk/divisional-services/staff/regius

Sir John Irving Bell (born 1 July 1952) is a Canadian-British immunologist and geneticist. From 2006 to 2011, he was President of the United Kingdom's Academy of Medical Sciences. Between 2002 and 2024, he held the Regius Chair of Medicine at the University of Oxford. From 2006, he was Chairman of the Office for Strategic Coordination of Health Research (OSCHR), but became a normal member of the OSCHR in 2020. Bell was selected to the Vaccine Taskforce sometime before 1 July 2020. Bell is also on the board of directors of the SOE quango Genomics England.

== Education and career ==
Bell was born in Edmonton, Alberta, where his parents worked in haematology and pharmacy. He attended Ridley College in St. Catharines, Ontario. He graduated from the University of Alberta in 1975, and then studied medicine on a Rhodes Scholarship at Magdalen College, Oxford. In 1978, he rowed in the Oxford University Lightweight Rowing Club Blue Boat which raced against the University of Cambridge.

In 1982, despite lacking advanced scientific qualifications, he took up a position as Clinical Fellow in Immunology with Hugh McDevitt at Stanford University, where he worked on histocompatibility antigens and autoimmune disease.

In 1987, Bell returned to Oxford as a Wellcome Trust Senior Clinical Fellow, and joined the Institute of Molecular Medicine, founded by David Weatherall. In 1992, he succeeded Weatherall as the Nuffield Professor of Clinical Medicine and, in 2002, became the Regius Professor of Medicine at Oxford, also after Weatherall. In 1994, Bell was one of the founders of the Wellcome Trust Centre for Human Genetics at Oxford University. He is an emeritus fellow of Magdalen College, Oxford. Bell is also the senior member of the Oxford University Women's Boat Club Executive Committee and is a member of the Governing Body of Christ Church, Oxford. He sat on the Council of the Medical Research Council between 1998 and 2003. Since 2011, Bell has been one of two Life Sciences Champions for the UK.

== Directorships, consulting and charity positions ==
Bell has been a non-executive director of Roche since 2001. A BMJ campaign to make the results of unpublished studies on the anti-influenza drug oseltamivir (Tamiflu) available to researchers led to the journal's editor Fiona Godlee urging Bell "as an internationally respected scientist and clinician and a leader of clinical research in the United Kingdom, to bring your influence to bear on your colleagues on Roche's board." Roche subsequently agreed to a wide policy of data transparency in clinical trials. Matthew Thompson and Carl Heneghan wrote in a letter to the journal "...according to Roche's 2011 financial report, John Bell received 390 000 Swiss Francs (£260 450; €322 450; $420 000) last year for his role on the board of directors. What do Roche and its shareholders expect for this level of involvement and remuneration?" The House of Commons Science and Technology Committee report on the subject broadly supported the release of more clinical trial data but urged caution on public release of individual patient data.

Bell serves on the Genentech Board in San Francisco, and formerly served on the scientific advisory board of AstraZeneca (1997–2000). He was the founding director of three biotechnology companies, including Oxagen, Avidex, and Powderject and is also on the Board of Atopix.

His charity positions include chairing the board of trustees of the Oxford Health Alliance and the science committee of the UK Biobank. He chairs the Global Health Scientific advisory board of the Bill & Melinda Gates Foundation, he is a Trustee of the Rhodes Trust, he sits on the award jury of the Gairdner Foundation, he is a non-executive member of Genomics England, and he is a member of Cancer Research UK. He has advised governments and foundations in Singapore, France, Canada, Sweden, Finland, and Alberta on biomedical research. He is on the Jenner Institute Board and the Gray Institute Board. He is on the advisory Board for the McGill Genomics Institute and the Montreal Neurological Institute, and chairs the advisory board for the Oak Foundation and the Robertson Foundation. He attended the 2013 Bilderberg Conference.

A 2021 feature article by freelance journalist Paul D Thacker in the BMJ stated: "The government and Oxford University's failure to be open about Bell's financial ties make[s] it impossible for the public to know what, if any, interests the professor has when influencing key decisions about which of the many covid-19 tests the UK should purchase."

== Research ==
Bell has identified genes involved in susceptibility to diabetes mellitus type 1 and rheumatoid arthritis and multiple sclerosis. His work has been important in elucidating the interactions on the surface of the T cell involved in immune activation. He has also worked on the biomedical applications of high-throughput genomic technologies, including structural genomics and ENU mutagenesis. He has been directly involved in applying genetics in a clinical settings and helped developed the 100,000 genome project for Genomics England.

== Honours and awards ==
Bell was elected a Fellow of the Academy of Medical Sciences (FMedSci) in 1998. He was awarded an honorary D.Sc. degree by the University of Alberta in 2003. Bell was President of the Academy of Medical Sciences from 2006 to 2011. In 2008, he was elected a Fellow of the Royal Society (FRS). He was appointed an Honorary Fellow of the Royal Academy of Engineering (HonFREng) in 2009, and was knighted in the 2008 New Year Honours for services to medicine. He has received honorary degrees from the Universities of York, Warwick, Glasgow, Dundee, Imperial College, King's College London and University of Toronto (2014).

He was appointed Knight Grand Cross of the Order of the British Empire (GBE) in the 2015 New Year Honours for services to medicine, medical research and the life science industry. In addition to Sir Charles Gordon and Sir Edward Beatty, Bell is one of the few Canadians to be admitted to the highest class in this order. He was appointed Member of the Order of the Companions of Honour (CH) in the 2023 Birthday Honours for services to medicine, medical research, the life science industry and public health.

Educational offices
Preceded by Keith Peters	President of the Academy of Medical Sciences; 2006–2011	Succeeded by John Tooke
