= Jamie D. K. Wilson =

British biologist

Jamie D. K. Wilson is a British biologist and the editor in chief of academic journal Nature Immunology.

== Education ==
Wilson studied biological science at the University of Warwick, before completing his PhD at the Weatherall Institute of Molecular Medicine at Oxford University, where he worked under the supervision of Andrew McMichael, on the host's immune response to HIV and Epstein–Barr virus.

Wilson then studied at the Chelsea and Westminster Hospital in the immunology team led by Frances Gotch. He continued research HIV during his post-doctorate research.

== Career ==
Wilson joined Nature Immunology prior to its launch in 2000 and works as the editor in chief.

== Selected publications ==
- Focus on Autoimmune Disease, (2018). United Kingdom, Macmillan Publishers (editor)
- Nature Milestones: Antibodies, (2016). United Kingdom, Springer Nature (co-editor)
