= Dharmasena =

Dharmasena is a surname. Notable people with the surname include:

- Kumar Dharmasena (born 1971), Sri Lankan cricketer and umpire
- Samararatne Dharmasena (1950–2007), Sri Lankan sprinter
- Suranjith Dharmasena (born 1965), Sri Lankan cricketer
- W. H. M. Dharmasena (born 1955), Sri Lankan politician
