= Anjali Kusumbe =

British biologist

- Scientific career
- Workplaces: Weatherall Institute of Molecular Medicine
- Website: Kusumbe Lab

Anjali Kusumbe is a British-Indian biologist who is the Head of the Tissue and Tumour Microenvironments Group at the Medical Research Council Weatherall Institute of Molecular Medicine at the University of Oxford. She was awarded the Royal Microscopical Society Award for Life Sciences in 2022.

== Early life and education ==
Kusumbe completed her doctorate as a Fellow of the Council of Scientific and Industrial Research in 2012. Her doctoral research considered the contributions of cancer stem cells and endothelial cells to the progression of ovarian cancer. She moved to the Max Planck Institute for Molecular Biomedicine for postdoctoral research, where she studied the heterogeneity of endothelial cells in bone, and uncovered a highly specialised blood vessel type which helped to uncover the relationships between bone vasculature and bone ageing.

== Research and career ==
In 2017, Kusumbe received the Medical Research Council Career Development Award, and in 2019 she was awarded a European Research Council Starting Grant. Kusumbe studies the transport networks formed by blood and lymphatic vessels. She is particularly interested in how these vessels evolve over time, and how this impacts the tissue regeneration, immune cells and spread of cancer.

== Selected Awards and honours ==
- 2014 German Society for Cell Biology Werner-Risau Memorial Award
- 2021 European Calcified Tissue Society Iain T Boyle Memorial Award
- 2022 Royal Microscopical Society Award for Life Sciences
- 2022 GOLD Award for efforts to improve sustainability and efficiency from Laboratory Efficiency Assessment Framework

== Selected publications ==
- Saravana K. Ramasamy; Anjali P. Kusumbe; Lin Wang; Adams, Ralf (2014). "Endothelial Notch activity promotes angiogenesis and osteogenesis in bone". Nature. 507 (7492): 376–380. doi:10.1038/nature13146. PMC 4943529. PMID 24647000. Wikidata Q37091548.
- Anjali P. Kusumbe; Saravana K. Ramasamy; Tomer Itkin; Maarja Andaloussi Mäe; Urs H. Langen; Christer Betsholtz; Tsvee Lapidot; Adams, Ralf (2016). "Age-dependent modulation of vascular niches for haematopoietic stem cells". Nature. 532 (7599): 380–384. doi:10.1038/nature17638. PMC 5035541. PMID 27074508. Wikidata Q37280872.
- Saravana K Ramasamy; Anjali P Kusumbe; Maria Schiller; et al. (2016). "Blood flow controls bone vascular function and osteogenesis". Nature Communications. 7 13601. Bibcode:2016NatCo...713601R. doi:10.1038/ncomms13601. PMC 5150650. PMID 27922003. Wikidata Q30831553.
