= Paul Bruce Beeson =

Paul Bruce Beeson KBE
- Born: 18 October 1908; Livingston, Montana
- Died: 14 August 2006 (aged 97); Exeter, New Hampshire
- Known for: discovery of interleukin-1
- Awards: Fellow of the Royal College of Physicians (1966); Member of the National Academy of Sciences (1969); Robert H. Williams Award of the Association of Professors of Medicine (1971); Bristol Award of the Infectious Diseases Society of America (1972); Kober Medal of the Association of American Physicians (1973); Honorary Knight Commander of the Order of the British Empire (1973); John Phillips Memorial Award of the American College of Physicians (1976)

Paul Bruce Beeson (18 October 1908 – 14 August 2006) was an American physician and professor of medicine, specializing in infectious diseases and the pathogenesis of fever.

== Biography ==
After undergraduate study at the University of Washington in Seattle, Paul Beeson studied medicine at McGill University Medical School, where he received his MD in 1933. After two years as an intern at the University of Pennsylvania Medical School, he joined his father's and elder brother's practice in Wooster, Ohio. In 1937 he became a research fellow at Manhattan's Rockefeller Institute for Medical Research. There he worked for two years in the laboratory of Oswald Avery. In 1939 he relocated to Harvard Medical School's teaching affiliate Peter Brent Brigham Hospital to work under Soma Weiss.

When experts predicted that Britain would suffer epidemics of infectious disease during the war, Harvard University and the American Red Cross gave Britain a complete fever hospital consisting of prefabricated wooden huts, shipped across the Atlantic during the Blitz along with volunteer doctors and nurses. Beeson spent two years at Harvard Hospital near Salisbury as a volunteer, returning to the US in 1942 when the epidemics did not materialise.

At Atlanta's Emory University School of Medicine Beeson became in 1942 an assistant professor and in 1946 a full professor and chair of medicine. From 1952 to 1965 he was chair of medicine at the Yale School of Medicine.

As successor to Leslie John Witts, Beeson was from 1965 to 1974 the Nuffield Professor of Clinical Medicine at the University of Oxford. He gave the Bradshaw Lecture in 1968. When he left Oxford he donated all the money from his Oxford pension for the upkeep of William Osler's old house at 13 Norham Gardens. The house became the warden's lodge of Green College. Beeson persuaded Cecil Howard Green, founder of Texas Instruments, to endow the first one million British pounds to establish the college. (In 2007 Green College and Templeton College were merged to form Green Templeton College, Oxford.)

With typical generosity, he retired from the chair in Oxford a year earlier than he needed so his successor, David Weatherall, could have a hand in designing the new department which was to be created at the John Radcliffe Hospital.

In 1974 Beeson became the VA distinguished professor of medicine at Seattle's University of Washington Medical School, retiring in 1981 as emeritus professor.

With a variety of collaborators, notably Elisha Atkins and Robert Petersdorf, he made important contributions to our understanding of the pathophysiology of bacterial endocarditis, clinical and experimental pyelonephritis, the mechanisms and importance of eosinophilia, and the pathogenesis of fever.

Beeson and Petersdorf published a clinical study of patients with persistent fevers of unknown cause – they suggested guidelines for diagnosing the causes.

The study, published in the journal Medicine in 1961, was "a landmark paper," said Dr. Lawrence S. Cohen, a cardiologist-internist and professor of medicine at Yale. Dr. Cohen said it was "as relevant in 2006 as in 1961, in pointing out causes that were not obvious and teaching clinicians what they should be thinking about in making a differential diagnosis".

In 1981 the Yale School of Medicine established the Paul B. Beeson professorship in internal medicine.

From 1950 to 1954 he was editor for Harrison's Principles of Internal Medicine (London, McGraw-Hill). From 1959 to 1982 he was a co-editor for the Cecil-Loeb Textbook of Medicine (Philadelphia/London, Saunders). He published The Eosinophil (Philadelphia/London, Saunders) in 1977. For The Oxford Companion to Medicine (Oxford, Oxford University Press, 1986), he was a co-editor with Sir Ronald Bodley Scott and then with Lord Walton after Bodley Scott's death.

William Hollingsworth's Taking Care: The Legacy of Soma Weiss, Eugene Stead and Paul Beeson (1995) and Richard Rapport's Physician: The Life of Paul Beeson (2001) explain the importance of Beeson's career.

Beeson married in 1942. Upon his death he was survived by his widow, two sons, a daughter, six grandchildren, and one great-grandchild.
