= List of fellows of the Royal Society elected in 2005 =

This is a list of people elected Fellow of the Royal Society in 2005.

== Fellows ==
- James Barber
- Martin Thomas Barlow
- Laurence David Barron
- Andrew Blake
- Harry Leonard Bryden
- Stephen John Williams Busby
- Luca Cardelli
- Deborah Charlesworth
- John Collinge
- Paul Bruce Corkum
- John Patrick Croxall
- Tom Curran
- John Francis Xavier Diffley
- Julian Downward
- Ronald David Ekers
- Robert Evans
- Philip Richard Evans
- Alastair Hugh Fitter
- Uta Frith
- David Christopher Gadsby
- Douglas Roland Higgs
- Brian Leslie Norman Kennett
- David William Masser
- Thomas Guy Masters
- Thomas Fulton Wilson McKillop
- Goverdhan Mehta
- Roger Ervin Miller
- Michael John Morgan
- Ian Paterson
- John Richard Anthony Pearson
- Philip Power
- Nicholas Jarvis Proudfoot
- Trevor William Robbins
- Douglas Alan Ross
- Philip St John Russell
- Peter John Sadler
- Christopher Maxwell Snowden
- David John Spiegelhalter
- Robert Daniel St Johnston
- Lloyd Nicholas Trefethen
- Richard Samuel Ward
- Colin Watts
- John Graham White
- Ernest Marshall Wright

== Foreign members ==
- Raoul Bott
- Catherine Jeanne Cesarsky
- Ilkka Aulis Hanski
- Hartmut Michel
- Ryoji Noyori
- Harold Eliot Varmus

== Honorary Fellow ==
- Leonard Wolfson
