= Order of the Companions of Honour =

Commonwealth order

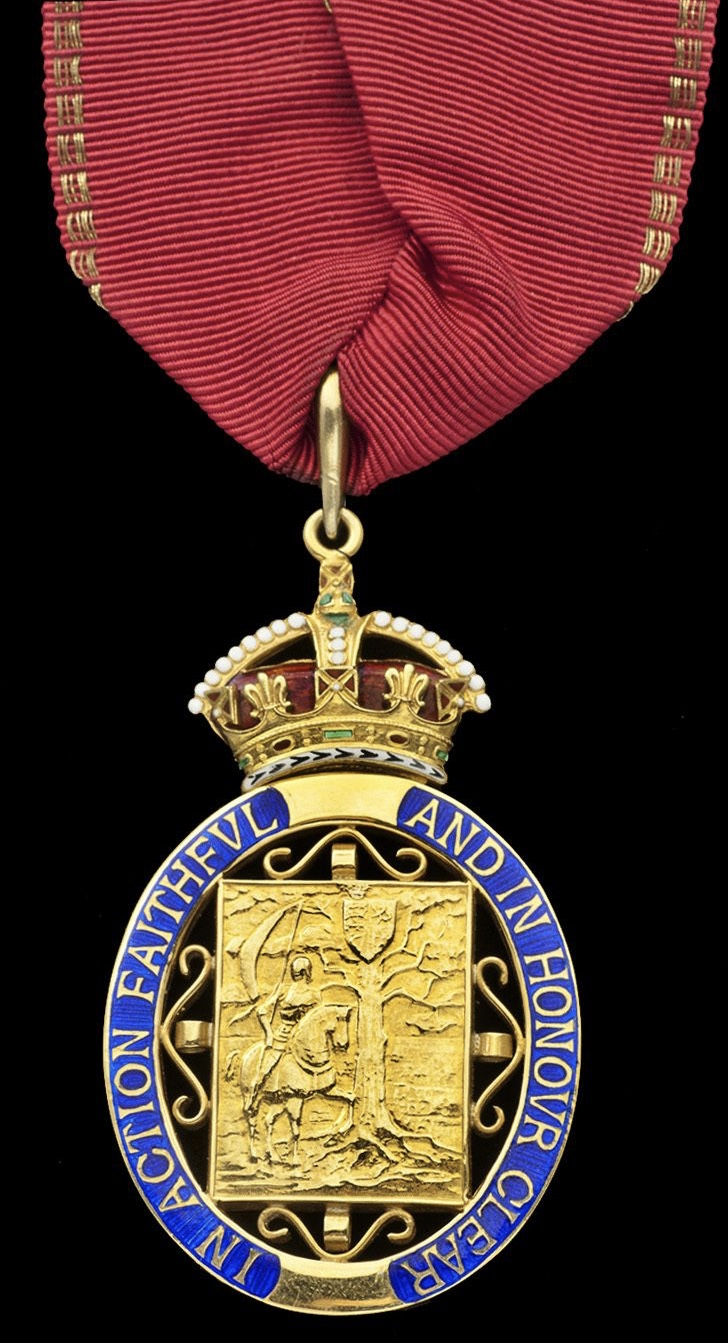
- Badge and ribbon of the order

Awarded by Charles III
- Type: Order
- Established: 4 June 1917
- Motto: In Action Faithful and in Honour Clear
- Eligibility: All living citizens of the Commonwealth realms
- Criteria: Nationally important service
- Status: Currently constituted
- Founder: George V
- Sovereign: Charles III
- Grades: Member (CH)
- Ribbon bar of the order

The Order of the Companions of Honour is an order of the Commonwealth realms. It was founded on 4 June 1917 by King George V as a reward for outstanding achievements. It was founded on the same date as the Order of the British Empire.

The order was originally intended to be conferred upon a limited number of persons for whom this special distinction seemed to be the most appropriate form of recognition, constituting an honour dissociated from either the acceptance of title or the classification of merit. It is now described as being "awarded for having a major contribution to the arts, science, medicine, or government lasting over a long period of time". The first recipients of the order were all decorated for "services in connection with the war" and were listed in The London Gazette. Modern appointments are also now announced in The Gazette.

== Composition ==
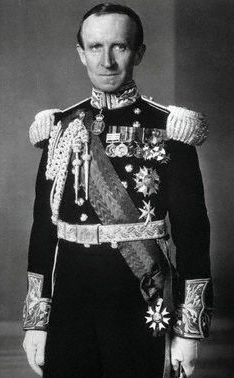
John Buchan, Lord Tweedsmuir, as Governor General of Canada, wearing the Order of the Companions of Honour badge around his neck

The order consists of the monarch of the Commonwealth realms, who is the Sovereign of the Order of the Companions of Honour, and a maximum of 65 members. Additionally, foreigners or Commonwealth citizens from outside the Commonwealth realms may be added as honorary members. Members are organised into a single class and are appointed by the monarch of the Commonwealth realms in their capacity as sovereign of the order. While membership of the order confers no title or precedence, those inducted into the order are entitled to use the post-nominal letters CH.

Appointments to the order are generally made on the advice of prime ministers of the Commonwealth realms. For Canadians, the advice to the Sovereign can come from a variety of officials. Originally, the order was limited to 50 ordinary members, but in 1943 it was enlarged to 65, with a quota of 45 members for the United Kingdom, seven for Australia, two each for New Zealand and South Africa, and nine for India, Burma, and the other British colonies. The quota numbers were altered in 1970 to 47 for the United Kingdom, seven for Australia, two for New Zealand, and nine for other Commonwealth realms. The quota was adjusted again in 1975 by adding two places to the New Zealand quota and reducing the nine for the other countries to seven.

Whilst still able to nominate candidates to the order, the Cabinet of Australia has in effect stopped making appointments to that country's citizens in preference to other Australian honours. The last Australian member, Doug Anthony, former Deputy Prime Minister of Australia, died on 20 December 2020. Members from other Commonwealth realms continue to be appointed: Dame Kiri Te Kanawa, a New Zealand soprano, was appointed in 2018 and Canadian author Margaret Atwood was appointed in 2019.

Lord Coe represented the Order at the 2023 Coronation.

== Insignia ==
The insignia of the order is an oval medallion, surmounted by a royal crown (but, until recently, surmounted by an imperial crown), and with a rectangular panel within, depicting on it an oak tree, a shield with the Royal Coat of Arms of the United Kingdom hanging from one branch, and, on the left, a mounted knight in armour. The insignia's blue border bears in gold letters the motto "in action faithful and in honour clear", Alexander Pope's description (in iambic pentameter) in his Epistle to Mr Addison of James Craggs the Younger, later used on Craggs's monument in Westminster Abbey. Men wear the badge on a neck ribbon (red with golden border threads) and women on a bow at the left shoulder.

== Current members ==
=== Sovereign ===
Name	Year of appointment	Present age
King Charles III (ex officio)	Sovereign since 2022	77

=== Royal Companion ===
Name	Year of appointment	Present age	Notes
Catherine, Princess of Wales GCVO, CH	2024	44	First Royal Companion

=== Members ===
Member number (Note: The number shown in brackets is the individual's place in the wider sequence of appointment since the Order's inception.)	Name	Known for	Year of appointment	Present age
1-(270)	Kenneth Baker, Baron Baker of Dorking CH, PC	Secretary of State for the Home Department	1992	91
2-(278)	Tom King, Baron King of Bridgwater CH, PC	Secretary of State for Defence	1992	93
3-(282)	Dame Janet Baker CH, DBE, FRSA	Opera singer	1993	93
4-(287)	David Owen, Baron Owen CH, PC	Secretary of State for Foreign and Commonwealth Affairs	1994	88
5-(289)	Sir David Attenborough OM, GCMG, CH, CVO, CBE, FRS, FSA, FRSA, FLS, FZS, FRSGS, FRSB	Television broadcaster and conservationist	1995	100
6-(291)	Douglas Hurd, Baron Hurd of Westwell CH, CBE, PC	Secretary of State for Foreign and Commonwealth Affairs and Secretary of State for the Home Department	1995	96
7-(296)	Michael Heseltine, Baron Heseltine CH, PC	Deputy Prime Minister of the United Kingdom and Secretary of State for Defence	1997	93
8-(297)	Chris Patten, Baron Patten of Barnes KG, CH, PC	Governor of Hong Kong, Chairman of the BBC Trust, and Chancellor of the University of Oxford	1997	82
9-(299)	Sir John Major KG, CH, PC	Prime Minister of the United Kingdom	1998	83
10-(300)	Bridget Riley CH, CBE	Artist	1998	95
11-(305)	General John de Chastelain CC, CMM, CD, CH	Chief of the Defence Staff (Canada) and Chairman of the Independent International Commission on Decommissioning	1998	89
12-(317)	Dan McKenzie CH, FRS	Geophysicist	2003	84
13-(318)	David Hannay, Baron Hannay of Chiswick GCMG, CH	Permanent Representative to the United Nations	2003	80
14-(320)	Dame Judi Dench CH, DBE, FRSA	Actress	2005	91
15-(321)	Sir Ian McKellen CH, CBE	Actor	2007	87
16-(323)	Michael Howard, Baron Howard of Lympne CH, PC, KC	Leader of His Majesty's Most Loyal Opposition and Secretary of State for the Home Department	2011	85
17-(324)	George Young, Baron Young of Cookham CH, PC	Parliamentary Secretary to the Treasury and Leader of the House of Commons of the United Kingdom	2012	85
18-(325)	Sebastian Coe, Baron Coe CH, KBE	President of World Athletics and Chairman of the British Olympic Association	2012	69
19-(327)	Thomas Galbraith, 2nd Baron Strathclyde CH, PC	Leader of the House of Lords and Chancellor of the Duchy of Lancaster	2013	66
20-(329)	Sir Nicholas Serota CH	Curator and Director of the Tate	2013	80
21-(331)	Onora O'Neill, Baroness O'Neill of Bengarve CH, CBE, FBA, FMedSci, MRIA	President of the British Academy	2013	83
22-(333)	Kenneth Clarke, Baron Clarke of Nottingham CH, PC, KC	Lord High Chancellor of Great Britain, Chancellor of the Exchequer and Secretary of State for the Home Department	2014	86
23-(336)	Lady Mary Peters LG, CH, DBE, DStJ	Olympic gold medallist and Lord Lieutenant of Belfast	2015	87
24-(339)	Harry Woolf, Baron Woolf CH, PC, FBA, FMedSci	Lord Chief Justice of England and Wales	2015	93
25-(341)	Sir Roy Strong CH, FRSL	Director of the Victoria and Albert Museum and National Portrait Gallery, London	2016	91
26-(343)	Robert Smith, Baron Smith of Kelvin KT, CH, FRSGS	Governor of the British Broadcasting Corporation	2016	82
27-(344)	Valerie Amos, Baroness Amos LG, CH, PC	United Nations Under-Secretary-General for Humanitarian Affairs and Emergency Relief Coordinator, Leader of the House of Lords and Secretary of State for International Development	2016	72
28-(345)	George Osborne CH, PC	Chancellor of the Exchequer and First Secretary of State	2016	55
29-(347)	Sir Richard Eyre CH, CBE	Director	2016	83
30-(348)	Dame Evelyn Glennie CH, DBE	Musician	2016	61
31-(349)	Sir Alec Jeffreys CH, FRS, MAE	Geneticist	2016	76
32-(353)	Sir Mark Elder CH, CBE	Conductor	2017	79
33-(355)	Sir Paul McCartney CH, MBE	Musician	2017	84
34-(356)	J. K. Rowling CH, OBE, FRSL, FRCPE	Author	2017	61
35-(358)	Delia Smith CH, CBE	Cook and author	2017	85
36-(359)	Nicholas Stern, Baron Stern of Brentford CH, FRS, FBA, FAcSS	President of the British Academy and Chief Economist of the World Bank	2017	80
37-(361)	Melvyn Bragg, Baron Bragg CH, FRS, FBA, FRSL	Broadcaster and Chancellor of the University of Leeds	2017	86
38-(362)	Lady Antonia Fraser CH, DBE, FRSL	Author	2017	94
39-(363)	Margaret MacMillan OM CC CH FRSL, FRSC, FBA, FRCGS	Historian, author and Provost of Trinity College, Toronto	2017	82
40-(364)	Richard Henderson CH, FRS, FMedSci	Biologist	2018	81
41-(365)	Dame Kiri Te Kanawa ONZ, CH, DBE, AC	Opera singer	2018	82
42-(366)	Margaret Atwood CC OOnt CH FRSC FRSL	Author	2018	86
43-(367)	Patrick McLoughlin, Baron McLoughlin CH, PC	Chancellor of the Duchy of Lancaster and Secretary of State for Transport	2019	68
44-(368)	Sir Elton John CH, CBE	Musician	2019	79
45-(369)	Sir Keith Thomas CH, FBA, FLSW, FRHistS	Historian and President of Corpus Christi College, Oxford	2019	93
46-(370)	Sir Paul Smith CH, CBE, RDI	Fashion designer	2020	80
47-(371)	Sir David Chipperfield CH, CBE, RA, RDI, RIBA, HRSA	Architect	2020	72
48-(372)	Sir Paul Nurse OM, CH, FRS, FMedSci, HonFREng, HonFBA, MAE	Geneticist and Nobel Laureate	2021	77
49-(374)	Sir Quentin Blake CH, CBE, FCSD, FRSL, RDI	Illustrator	2022	93
50-(375)	Sir Salman Rushdie CH, FRSL	Author	2022	79
51-(376)	Dame Marina Warner CH, DBE, FRSL, FBA	Author	2022	79
52-(377)	Sir Michael Marmot CH, FRCP, FFPM, FMedSci, FBA	Academic	2022	81
53-(379)	Sir Bill Cash CH	Shadow Secretary of State for Constitutional Affairs and Shadow Attorney General for England and Wales	2023	86
54-(380)	Sir John Bell GBE, CH, FRS, FMedSci, FREng	President of the Office for Strategic Coordination of Health Research	2023	74
55-(381)	Ian McEwan CH, CBE, FRSA, FRSL	Author	2023	78
56-(382)	Dame Anna Wintour CH, DBE	Media executive	2023	76
57-(383)	Dame Shirley Bassey CH, DBE	Singer	2023	89
58-(385)	Gordon Brown CH, PC, HonFRSE	Prime Minister of the United Kingdom	2024	75
59-(386)	Sir Kazuo Ishiguro CH, OBE, FRSA, FRSL	Novelist and screenwriter	2024	71
60-(387)	Dame Jocelyn Bell Burnell CH DBE FRS FRSE FRAS	Physicist	2025	83
61-(388)	Sir Antony Gormley CH, OBE, RA	Sculptor	2025	76
62-(389)	Sir Donald McCullin CH, CBE	Photojournalist	2026	90
63-(390)	Dame Helen Mirren CH, DBE	Actress	2026	81
64-	Vacant following the death of Menzies Campbell, Baron Campbell of Pittenweem, on 26 September 2025			
65-	Vacant following the death of David Hockney, on 11 June 2026			

=== Honorary Members ===
Member number	Name	Known for	Year of appointment	Present age
1-(261)	Amartya Sen CH, FBA	Economist	2000	92

== See also ==
- List of honorary British knights and dames
