= Cerundolo =

Cerundolo is an Italian surname. Notable people with the surname include:

- Constanza Cerundolo (born 2000), Argentine field hockey player
- Francisco Cerúndolo (born 1998), Argentine tennis player
- Juan Manuel Cerúndolo (born 2001), Argentine tennis player
- Vincenzo Cerundolo (1959–2020), Italian medical researcher

== See also ==
- Cherundolo, surname
