= Brigitte Askonas =

British immunologist (1923–2013)

Brigitte Askonas FRS FMedSci
- Born: Brigitte Alice Askonas; 1 April 1923; Vienna, Austria
- Died: 9 January 2013 (aged 89)
- Education: McGill University (BSc, MSc); University of Cambridge (PhD)
- Awards: Robert Koch Gold Medal (2007); Member of the National Academy of Sciences (2007)
- Scientific career
- Workplaces: John Radcliffe Hospital; University of Cambridge; Harvard Medical School; Imperial College London; McGill University; National Institute for Medical Research
- Thesis: The separation of enzymes by means of organic solvents at low temperatures: application to aqueous rabbit-muscle extract with a study of creatine-phosphokinase (1952)
- Doctoral advisor: Malcolm Dixon
- Doctoral students: Andrew McMichael; Alain Townsend

Brigitte Alice Askonas (1 April 1923 – 9 January 2013) was a British immunologist and a visiting professor at Imperial College London from 1995.

== Education ==
Brigitte Askonas was born to Czechoslovak parents, Jewish converts to Catholicism, who fled Austria after the Nazi takeover. Vienna-born Askonas studied biochemistry at McGill University (BSc, MSc) and carried out her postgraduate work in the school of biochemistry at the University of Cambridge where she was a student of Girton College, Cambridge and worked in Frederick Sanger's laboratory from 1948 to 1952.

Her role models in the department included two distinguished scientists, Marjory Stephenson and Dorothy Needham, two of the first women to be elected to the Royal Society. She said they taught her that "good science gets recognition regardless of the sex of the scientist". Her PhD research was supervised by Malcolm Dixon.

== Career and research ==
Her first position was at the Allan Memorial Institute of Psychiatry (associated with McGill University). In 1952, she joined the staff of the National Institute for Medical Research (NIMR) where she served as head of the division of Immunology from 1976 to 1988.

During that time, she worked extensively with fellow immunologist John H. Humphrey to establish the immunology divisions. Askonas focused on B cells and determined their role in producing antibodies as part of the immune response.

At the NIMR she began researching the biosynthesis of polypeptides in milk proteins discovering that the peptides were synthesised from amino acids rapidly in one piece. From 1955 to 1959 she studied the sites of antibody formation using radioactivity to develop our understanding of antibody molecules and the cells of the immune system. From 1959 to 1961 she studied plasma cell tumors as models for antibody formation. She went on to investigate macrophages and their role in antigen presentation (1962–1968). From 1963 to 1966 she studied the fate of antigen in relation to antibody formation and later continued her study of B cells from 1965 to 1970.

She wrote several biographies of high-profile scientists, including Niels Kaj Jerne, César Milstein and John Herbert Humphrey. Askonas conducted a filmed interview with Stanley Peart as a segment of what became the Medical Sciences Video Archive housed in the special collections of the library at Oxford Brookes University.

== Awards and honours ==
- 2007: Foreign associate of the National Academy of Sciences of the United States
- 2007: Robert Koch Gold Medal
- 1998: Fellow of the Academy of Medical Sciences (FMedSci).
- 1973: Elected Fellow of the Royal Society
