= Julian Downward =

English research director

Julian Downward FRS FMedSci
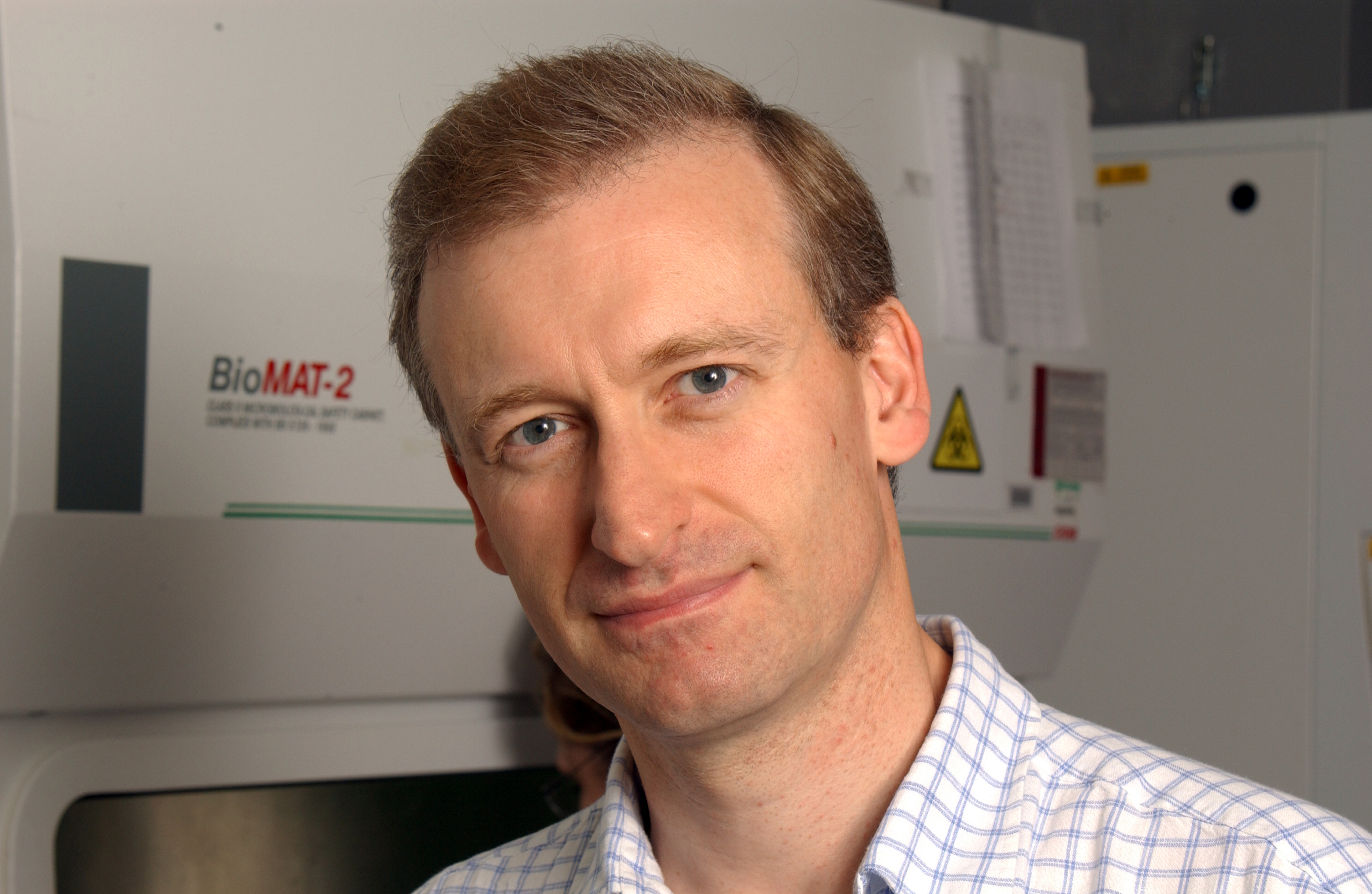
- Born: 25 October 1960 (age 66)
- Employers: Francis Crick Institute (2015–); Whitehead Institute (1986–1989)
- Scientific career
- Fields: Cancer biology
- Thesis: The structure and function of the receptor for epidermal growth factor (1986)
- Doctoral advisor: Michael Waterfield
- Other academic advisors: Robert Weinberg
- Website: crick.ac.uk/research/a-z-researchers/researchers-d-h/julian-downward/

David Julian Harry Downward (born 25 October 1960) is Principal Group Leader at the Francis Crick Institute in London, where he was also Associate Research Director from 2016-2023. He was Senior Group Leader at the Institute of Cancer Research from 2011-2019 and Associate Director at the Cancer Research UK London Research Institute from 2005-2016. He was formerly head of the Signal transduction Laboratory at the London Research Institute from 2002-2016, and before that at the Imperial Cancer Research Fund Laboratories from 1989-2002.

== Education ==
Downward was educated at Eton College and earned a first class Bachelor of Arts degree in Natural Sciences from Clare College, Cambridge. His PhD was supervised by Michael Waterfield at the Imperial Cancer Research Fund where he investigated Epidermal growth factor receptor, establishing in 1984 the close similarity between this cellular growth regulatory protein and the avian retroviral oncogene, v-erbB. This work led to the identification of the closely related cellular oncogene ErbB2/HER2, which is over-expressed in a major subset of breast cancers and is the target of the important targeted therapy, trastuzumab. From 1986 to 1989, he was a postdoctoral researcher with Robert Weinberg, at the Whitehead Institute for biomedical research at the Massachusetts Institute of Technology.

== Research ==
Downward's research investigates cancer biology. His work on the RAS GTPase has made seminal contributions to our understanding of how cellular signal transduction pathways are subverted in oncogenic transformation. His work provided the first demonstration that Guanosine triphosphate-loading on RAS, which is commonly mutationally activated in human tumours, is normally regulated in response to extracellular factors; he went on to characterise growth factor receptor complexes mediating RAS nucleotide exchange, and to demonstrate that GTP-bound RAS binds to and activates the RAF kinase, which controls the mitogen-activated protein kinase pathway. Downward was first to demonstrate that phosphoinositide 3-kinase (PI 3-kinase) is also a RAS effector, important in regulation of apoptosis. He showed that transformation by RAS requires interaction with multiple effectors, which contribute differentially to cell cycle progression, cytoskeletal regulation and apoptosis. His work has established that both cell matrix and cell–cell interaction activate the PI 3-kinase/PKB pathway, and thereby prevent programmed cell death, and that it is activation of this pathway by oncogenic RAS that allows anchorage-independent growth of malignantly transformed cells. He has contributed to the development of drugs that block the interaction of RAS proteins with PI 3-kinase that are now in clinical trials for cancer. More recently he has focused on identifying unique weaknesses of cancer cells expressing the activated RAS oncogene using a combination of large-scale functional genomics and pre-clinical models of lung cancer. In addition he has investigated the effect of oncogenic RAS on the interaction of tumors with the immune system and the potential benefit of therapeutic combinations targeting both RAS proteins and immune checkpoints.

== Awards and honours ==
Downward was elected a Fellow of the Royal Society (FRS) in 2005. He was also elected Fellow of the Academy of Medical Sciences in 2009 and was a member of the Faculty of 1000 from 2001 to 2005. He is a member of the European Molecular Biology Organisation (1995) and an honorary Fellow of the Royal College of Physicians (2012). In 2022, he was elected a member of the Academia Europaea. In 2023 he was elected a Fellow of the American Association for Cancer Research Academy. In 2023 he was awarded the Signal Transduction Society Honorary Medal.

== Personal life ==
Downward is the son of Major General Sir Peter Aldcroft Downward. He is married to Dr Tanya Basu and has three children.
