= Jayne S. Danska =

Immunologist in Canada

Jayne S. Danska is an immunologist in Canada. Danska is a Senior Scientist at the Hospital for Sick Children, a Professor at the University of Toronto's Faculty of Medicine, and the Anne and Max Tanenbaum Chair in Molecular Medicine.

== Research ==
Danska holds a PhD in Genetics and Molecular Biology from Cornell University. Her lab's research involves using both animal models and humans to investigate the mechanisms underlying immune system diseases (such as Type 1 diabetes), and improve diagnosis, prevention and treatment. Danska is also one of the 14 researchers involved in the Integrated Microbiome Platforms for Advancing Causation Testing and Translation (IMPACTT), a pan-Canadian cross-disciplinary group conducting microbiome research.

Previously, Danska's research found that in children with acute lymphoblastic leukemia, at the time of diagnosis, subpopulations of leukemic cells can cause a relapse. Additionally, in collaboration with John Dick, research from Danska's lab has previously led to the discovery of a gene (SIRPalpha) which can both support and destroy the growth of human blood stem cells, and was used to enable the successful grafting of stem cells from human bone marrow into mice. Ultimately, the researchers aim to develop a therapy to allow more children with blood diseases to receive life-saving bone marrow transplants.

In 2022, Danska was selected as one of Canada's Most Powerful Women: Top 100. She has spoken about different aspects of the COVID-19 pandemic, including the BA.4 And BA.5 SARS-CoV-2 variants, and the expected changes in menstruation after taking a COVID-19 vaccine.

Danska has published over 140 academic papers, which have been collectively cited over 8,000 times.

== Selected academic publications ==
- Interleukin 4 reverses T cell proliferative unresponsiveness and prevents the onset of diabetes in nonobese diabetic mice. Micha J Rapoport, A Jaramillo, D Zipris, AH Lazarus, DV Serreze, EH Leiter, P Cyopick, JS Danska, and TL Delovitch. 1997. Journal of Experimental Medicine.
- Polymorphism in Sirpa modulates engraftment of human hematopoietic stem cells. Katsuto Takenaka, Tatiana K Prasolava, Jean CY Wang, Steven M Mortin-Toth, Sam Khalouei, Olga I Gan, John E Dick, and Jayne S Danska. 2007. Nature Immunology.
- Stem cell gene expression programs influence clinical outcome in human leukemia. Kolja Eppert, Katsuto Takenaka, Eric R Lechman, Levi Waldron, Björn Nilsson, Peter Van Galen, Klaus H Metzeler, Armando Poeppl, Vicki Ling, Joseph Beyene, Angelo J Canty, Jayne S Danska, Stefan K Bohlander, Christian Buske, Mark D Minden, Todd R Golub, Igor Jurisica, Benjamin L Ebert, and John E Dick. 2011. Nature Medicine.
- Sex differences in the gut microbiome drive hormone-dependent regulation of autoimmunity. Janet GM Markle, Daniel N Frank, Steven Mortin-Toth, Charles E Robertson, Leah M Feazel, Ulrike Rolle-Kampczyk, Martin Von Bergen, Kathy D McCoy, Andrew J Macpherson, and Jayne S Danska. 2013. Science.
