= Jennifer Rubin (policy analyst) =

British social scientist and academic

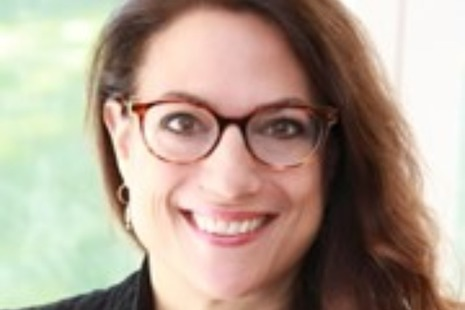
- Citizenship: British
- Education: University of Cambridge
- Scientific career
- Fields: Social science, political science
- Workplaces: RAND Europe; King's College London; ESRC; Home Office
- Thesis: Selecting gender : women, management and the corporate interview (1995)

Jennifer Kateman Rubin CBE is a British social scientist and policy analyst who is professor of public policy at King's College London. A graduate and doctorate in social and political sciences, her research covers a wide area including research policy, government policy, public health and social care. She is elected Fellow of the Academy of Social Sciences. She is currently the Chief Scientific Officer at the UK Home office.

== Education ==
Rubin studied B.A. in European politics at the Loughborough University and graduated in 1990 in first class honours. Enroling for Ph.D. in the Department of Social and Political Sciences at the University of Cambridge, she earned her doctorate in 1995. That year, she was awarded the Opportunity Research Scholars' Program (ORS) by which she worked at King's College London. Her thesis was Selecting gender : women, management and the corporate interview, which she partially published as "Gender, Equality and the Culture of Organizational Assessment" in the book Gender, Work & Organization in 1997.

== Career ==
In 1993, Rubin worked as a lecturer of sociology and politics at the Anglia Ruskin University, and as lecturer of psychology at the Middlesex University. In 2006, she joined RAND Europe, a non-profit research institute in Cambridge, as an analyst, and became the director of Communities, Safety and Justice Programme in 2010.

Since 2007, she sits on the board of the Office for Strategic Coordination of Health Research. In May 2015, she was appointed Director of the Policy Institute at King's College London, and continues to serve as its professor.

Rubin assumed the Executive Chair at the Economic and Social Research Council (ESRC) and the Champion for Equality, Diversity and Inclusion at UK Research and Innovation from 2017 to 2020. In 2018, she was appointed as member of the Industrial Strategy Council, an advisory board under the Department for Business, Energy and Industrial Strategy. In 2020, she was appointed Chief Scientific Adviser at the UK Home office. She succeeded Sir John Aston, Harding Professor of Statistics in Public Life at Cambridge. She concurrently held the position of Director General of Science, Technology, Analysis, Research and Strategy at the Home Office. She took up from the offices in January 2021.

== Honours and awards ==
Rubin was elected Fellow of the Academy of Social Sciences in 2020. She has been member of NATO's taskforce on ethnic intolerance in the military, as well as the US National Academy of Sciences' network of experts connecting economic, social and behavioural research with policy questions about COVID-19. In 2026 she was awarded a CBE for services to science and analysis.
