= Wilson Jameson =

Scottish medical doctor (1885–1962)

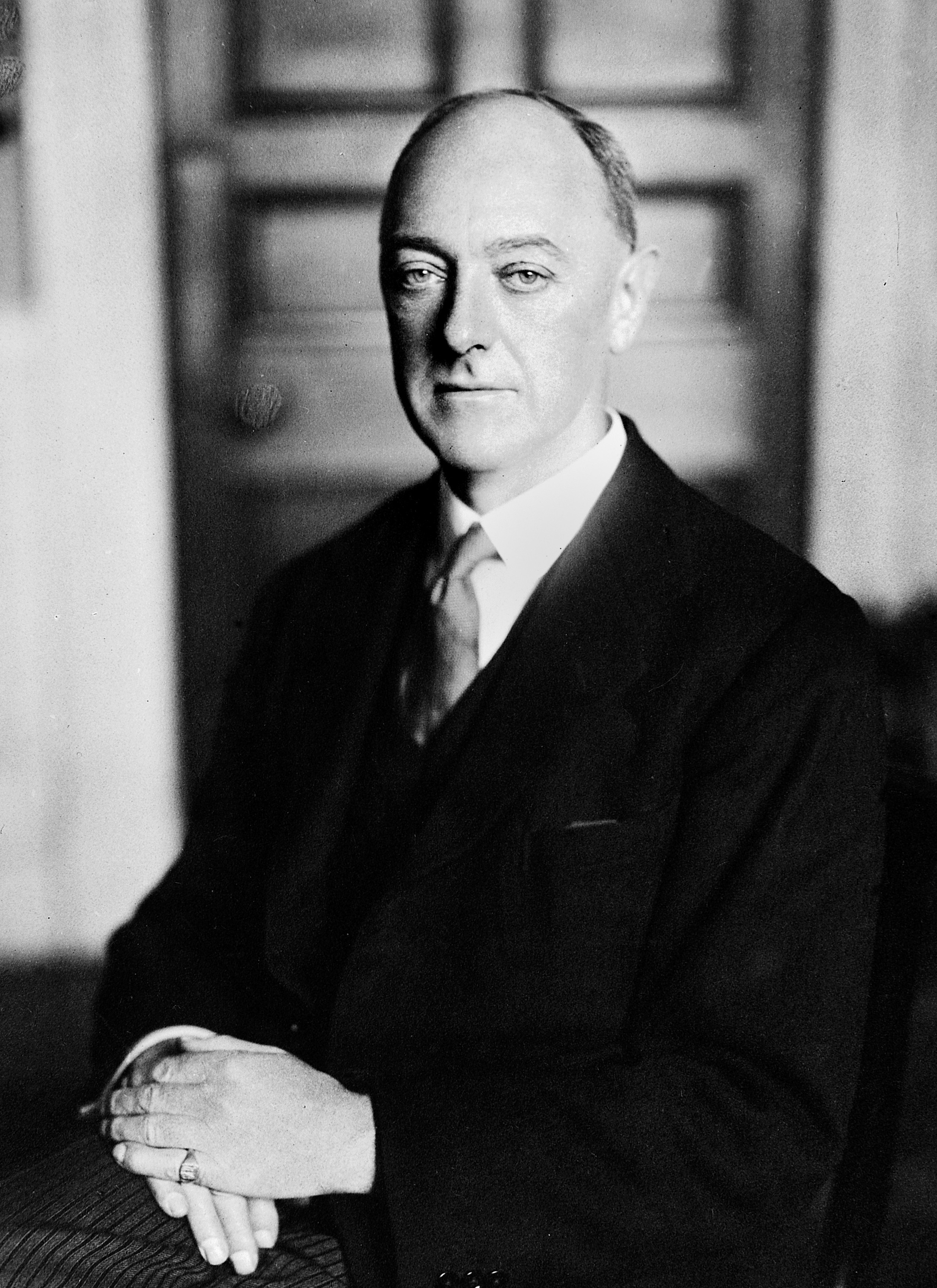
- Born: 12 May 1885
- Died: 18 October 1962 (aged 77)
- Occupation: Physician
- Employer: London School of Hygiene & Tropical Medicine (–1940)
- Awards: Buchanan Medal (For his distinguished administrative service to hygienic science and practice., 1942)
- Position held: Chief Medical Officers (1940–1950)

Sir (William) Wilson Jameson GBE KCB (12 May 1885 – 18 October 1962) was a Scottish medical doctor and the ninth Chief Medical Officer of England, from 1940 to 1950.

Jameson was born in Perth, Scotland and educated at the University of Aberdeen. He moved to London before the First World War and was appointed as Medical Officer of Health in Finchley and St Marylebone in 1920. He also trained in law and was called to the Bar in 1922. He was appointed Dean of the London School of Hygiene and Tropical Medicine in 1931.

He introduced much more public health information than had been seen before and was not afraid to tackle sensitive subjects such as venereal disease, the subject of a BBC radio broadcast on 23 October 1942.

He was influential in the detailed planning for the introduction of the National Health Service where he worked closely with Aneurin Bevan. Subsequently, healthcare services came to be the main focus of the work of the Chief Medical Officer, rather than public health.

After retirement in 1950 he became medical adviser to the King Edward's Hospital Fund for London.

In 1952 Jameson chaired the Second British National Conference on Social Work, which was held in London.
