= Vincenzo Cerundolo =

Italian medical researcher (1959–2020)

Vincenzo Cerundolo FRS FMedSci
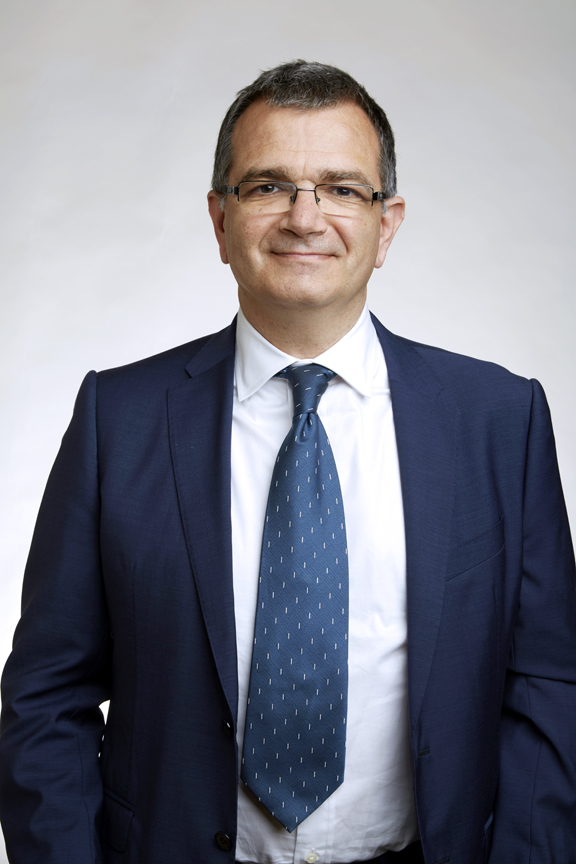
- Cerundolo in 2018
- Born: 20 December 1959; Lecce, Italy
- Died: 7 January 2020 (aged 60)
- Education: Liceo Scientifico De Giorgi
- Alma mater: University of Padua
- Scientific career
- Institutions: University of Oxford; John Radcliffe Hospital
- Website: www.rdm.ox.ac.uk/people/vincenzo-cerundolo

Vincenzo Cerundolo FRS (20 December 1959 – 7 January 2020) was an Italian medical researcher who was the Director of the Medical Research Council (MRC) Human Immunology Unit at the University of Oxford, at the John Radcliffe Hospital and a Professor of Immunology at the University of Oxford. He was also a Supernumerary Fellow at Merton College, Oxford. He was known for his discoveries in processing and presentation of cancer and viral peptides to T cells and lipids to invariant NKT cells. Cerundolo died of lung cancer on 7 January 2020.

== Early life and education ==
Vincenzo Cerundolo was born in Lecce (Italy) on 20 December 1959 to Vittorio Cerundolo and Colomba Vissicchio. He went to school at Liceo Scientifico De Giorgi (Lecce) and then to the University of Padua to study Medicine (1979-1984). He went on to complete a higher degree at the University of Padua at the Institute of Oncology supervised by Dino Collavo and Paola Zanovello.

== Career and research ==
After his studies at the University of Padua, Cerundolo completed his postdoctoral research with Professor Alain Townsend at the Weatherall Institute of Molecular Medicine, at the University of Oxford. He was first to demonstrate that TAP genes located within the major histocompatibility complex (MHC) transport peptides presented by MHC class I molecules and describe a novel clinical syndrome in patients with defective TAP genes. He characterised the relationship between the length of peptides and their binding affinity to MHC class I molecules, explaining the homogeneous length of peptides isolated from MHC class I molecules. He characterised the structural and kinetic mechanisms by which lipids bind to CD1 molecules and are recognized by T cells and demonstrated that harnessing CD1 restricted Natural killer T cell (NKT) cells enhances antigen specific antibody and T cell responses.

Cerundolo became Director of the MRC Human Immunology Unit in 2010.

=== Publications ===
His publications include:

- Cerundolo, V., J. Alexander, K. Anderson, C. Lamb, P. Cresswell, A. McMichael, F. Gotch, and A. Townsend. 1990. Presentation of viral antigen controlled by a gene in the major histocompatibility complex. Nature 345:449-452.
- Moins-Teisserenc, H.T., S.D. Gadola, M. Cella, P.R. Dunbar, A. Exley, N. Blake, C. Baykal, J. Lambert, P. Bigliardi, M. Willemsen, M. Jones, S. Buechner, M. Colonna, W.L. Gross, and V. Cerundolo. 1999. Association of a syndrome resembling Wegener's granulomatosis with low surface expression of HLA class-I molecules. Lancet 354:1598-1603.
- Cerundolo V, Elliott T, Elvin J, Bastin J, Rammensee HG, Townsend A. The binding affinity and dissociation rates of peptides for class I major histocompatibility complex molecules. 1991. Eur J Immunol, 21:2069-75.
- Romero, P., P.R. Dunbar, D. Valmori, M. Pittet, G.S. Ogg, D. Rimoldi, J.L. Chen, D. Lienard, J.C. Cerottini, and V. Cerundolo. 1998. Ex vivo staining of metastatic lymph nodes by class I major histocompatibility complex tetramers reveals high numbers of antigen-experienced tumor-specific cytolytic T lymphocytes. J Exp Med 188:1641-1650.
- Gileadi U, Moins-Teisserenc HT, Correa I, Booth B Jr, Dunbar PR, Sewell AK, Trowsdale J, Phillips RE, Cerundolo V. 1999. Generation of an Immunodominant CTL epitope is affected by proteasome subunit composition and stability of the antigenic protein. J Immunol, 163:6045-6052.
- Palmowski MJ, Gileadi U, Salio M, Gallimore A, Millrain M, James E, Addey C, Scott D, Dyson J, Simpson E, Cerundolo V. 2006. Role of Immunoproteasomes in cross-presentation. J Immunol, 177: 983-990.
- Chen, J.-L., G. Stewart-Jones, G. Bossi, M.N. Lissin, L. Wooldridge, E. Choi, G. Held, P.R. Dunbar, R. Esnouf, M. Sami, J.M. Boulter, P. Rizkallah, C. Renner, A. Sewell, P.A. van der Merwe, B.K. Jakobsen, G. Griffiths, E. Jones, and V. Cerundolo. 2005. Structural and kinetic basis for heightened immunogenicity of T-cell vaccines. J. Exp. Medicine 201:1243-1255.
- Palmowski, M., Choi, E., Hermans, I., Gilbert, S., Chen, J-L., Gileadi, U., Salio, M., Van Pel, A., Man, S., Bonin, E., Liljestrom P., Dunbar, P.R., Cerundolo, V. 2002. Competition between cytotoxic T lymphocytes narrows the immune response induced by prime-boost vaccination protocols. J Immunol, 168: 4391-4398.
- Gadola, S.D., N.R. Zaccai, K. Harlos, D. Shepherd, J.C. Castro-Palomino, G. Ritter, R.R. Schmidt, E.Y. Jones, and V. Cerundolo. 2002. Structure of human CD1b with bound ligands at 2.3 Å, a maze for alkyl chains. Nature Immunol 3:721-726.
- Koch, M., V.S. Stronge, D. Shepherd, S.D. Gadola, B. Mathew, G. Ritter, A.R. Fersht, G.S. Besra, R.R. Schmidt, E.Y. Jones, and V. Cerundolo. 2005. The crystal structure of human CD1d with and without alpha-galactosylceramide. Nature Immunol 6:819-826.
- McCarthy, C., D. Shepherd, S. Fleire, V.S. Stronge, M. Koch, P.A. Illarionov, G. Bossi, M. Salio, G. Denkberg, F. Reddington, A. Tarlton, B.G. Reddy, R.R. Schmidt, Y. Reiter, G.M. Griffiths, P.A. van der Merwe, G.S. Besra, E.Y. Jones, F.D. Batista, and V. Cerundolo. 2007. The length of lipids bound to human CD1d molecules modulates the affinity of NKT cell TCR and the threshold of NKT cell activation. J Exp Med 204:1131-1144.
- Hermans, I.F., J.D. Silk, U. Gileadi, M. Salio, B. Mathew, G. Ritter, R. Schmidt, A.L. Harris, L. Old, and V. Cerundolo. 2003. NKT cells enhance CD4+ and CD8+ T cell responses to soluble antigen in vivo through direct interaction with dendritic cells. J Immunol 171:5140-5147.
- Silk, J. Hermans, I, Gileadi, U., Chong, W., Shepherd, D., Salio, M., Mathew, B., Schmidt, R.R., Lunt, S. Williams, K., Stratford, I., Harris A., and Cerundolo V. 2004. Utilizing the adjuvant properties of CD1d-dependent NKT cells in T cell-mediated immunotherapy. J Clinical Investigation. 114:1800-1811.

=== Awards and honours ===
- Elected a Fellow of the Academy of Medical Sciences (FMedSci) in 2002
- Elected a Fellow of the Royal Society (FRS) in 2018

== Personal life ==
Married in 1987, Cerundolo had one daughter and one son.
