= Nuffield Professor of Clinical Medicine =

Chair at the University of Oxford

The Nuffield Professorship of Clinical Medicine is a chair at the University of Oxford. Created by the endowment of William Morris, 1st Viscount Nuffield, it was established in 1937. The chair is associated with a fellowship of Magdalen College, Oxford.

== List of Nuffield Professors of Clinical Medicine ==
- 1937–1965: Leslie John Witts
- 1965–1974: Paul Bruce Beeson
- 1974–1992: Sir David Weatherall
- 1992–2002: Sir John Bell
- 2004–2016: Sir Peter Ratcliffe
- 2019–present: Richard Cornall
