= List of fellows of the Royal Society elected in 1969 =

Fellows of the Royal Society elected in 1969.

== Fellows ==
1. Horace Basil Barlow
2. Sir Robert Lewis Fullarton Boyd
3. John Hugh Chesters
4. Sir Alan Hugh Cook
5. George William Cooke
6. Peter Victor Danckwerts
7. Paul Fatt
8. John Robert Stanley Fincham
9. Harold Montague Finniston
10. William Sefton Fyfe
11. William Reginald Stephen Garton
12. Philip George Houthem Gell
13. Quentin Howieson Gibson
14. John Anthony Hardinge Giffard, 3rd Earl of Halsbury
15. Eugen Glueckauf
16. Benjamin Arthur Hems
17. George Adrian Horridge
18. Robin Ralph Jamison
19. Sir Aaron Klug
20. Leslie William Mapson
21. Sir Alexander Walter Merrison
22. Sir Charles William Oatley
23. Sir Thomas Angus Lyall Paton
24. Sir William Stanley Peart
25. Sir Herbert Charles Pereira
26. Sir Lionel Alexander Bethune Pilkington
27. Charles Terence Clegg Wall
28. Sir Alan Walsh
29. Philip Frank Wareing
30. Winifred May Watkins
31. Karel Frantisek Wiesner
32. James Hardy Wilkinson

== Foreign members ==
1. Viktor Amazaspovich Ambartsumian
2. Inge Lehmann
3. Alfred Sherwood Romer
4. Kenneth Vivian Thimann

== Statute 12 Fellow ==
- Harold Wilson
