= John McMichael (cardiologist) =

British cardiologist

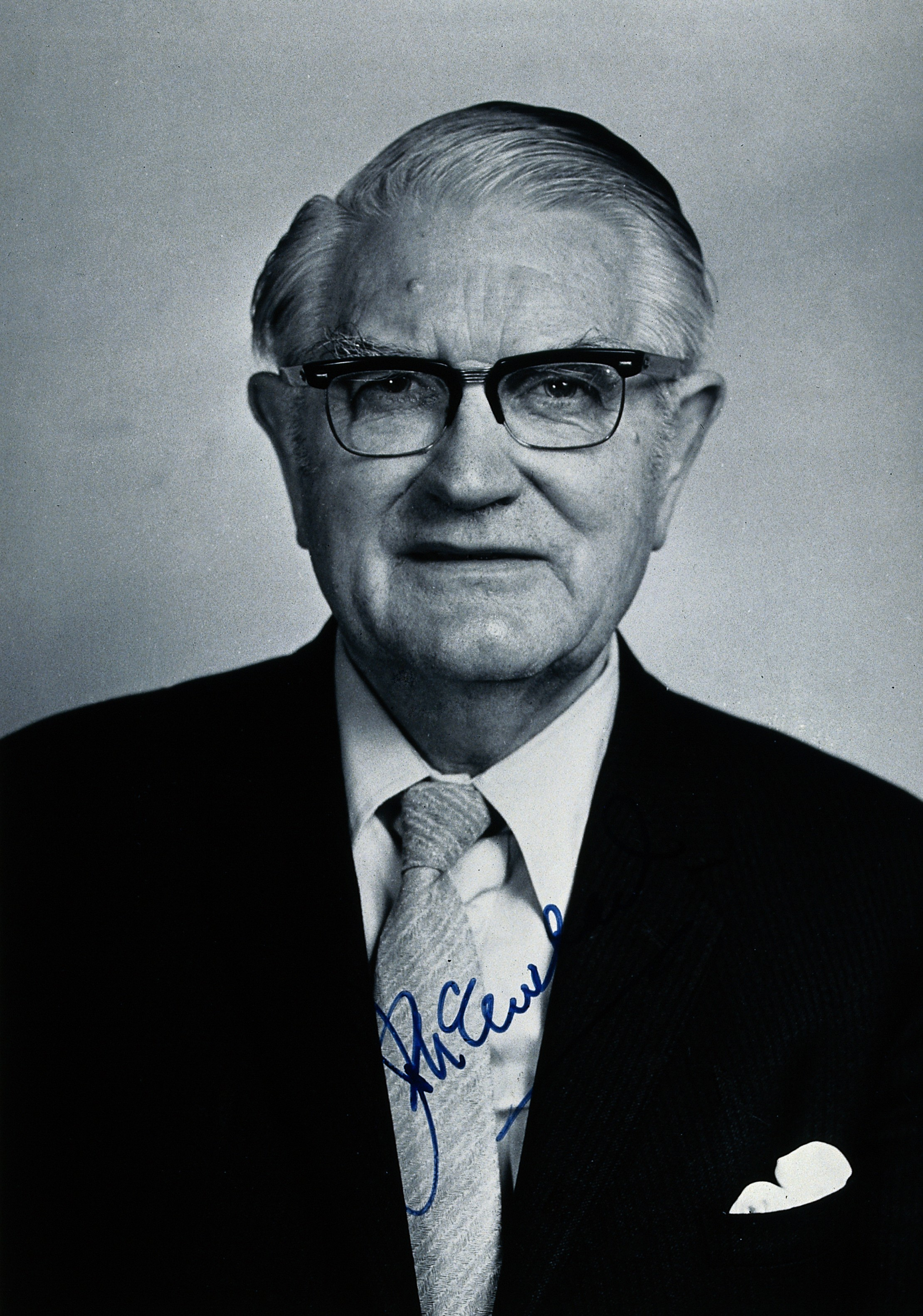
Sir John McMichael

Sir John McMichael FRSE LLD (25 July 1904 – 4 March 1993) was a 20th-century Scottish cardiologist. He developed the Royal Post Graduate Medical School at Hammersmith.

== Life ==
He was born on 25 July 1904 in Gatehouse of Fleet in Kirkcudbrightshire, the son of a butcher and farmer of a smallholding. He was educated at Girthon School by William Learmonth, father of James Learmonth who encouraged him to enter Kirkcudbright Academy where he became school dux. He then studied medicine at the University of Edinburgh graduating MB ChB in 1927 and then became an Ettles Scholar and assistant to Sir Stanley Davidson.

In 1932 he went to London as a Beit Memorial Fellow at University College Hospital, working with Sir Thomas Lewis and John McNee. He returned to Edinburgh in 1934 and specialised in cardiology. In 1936 he was elected a Fellow of the Royal Society of Edinburgh. His proposers were Ivan De Burgh Daly, Philip Eggleton, Alfred Joseph Clark, and David Murray Lyon. He resigned in 1957.

In 1939 he was invited to Hammersmith by Prof Francis Fraser to the new school of medicine in Hammersmith in London. McMichael became its Director in 1946 and remained in the post for 20 years. He was knighted by Queen Elizabeth II for services to medicine in 1965. He retired in 1966.

He died in Oxford on 4 March 1993.

== Family ==
In 1932, he married Joan McPherson (d.1989); they had two sons and divorced. In 1942, he married a second time, this time to Sybil Blake by whom he had another two sons including Andrew James McMichael. Following her death in 1965 he married a third and final time, to Dr Sheila Howarth, widow of Peter Sharpey Schafer.

== Publications ==
- Pharmacology of the Failing Heart (1951)
