= Cherundolo =

Cherundolo is a surname. Notable people with the surname include:

- Chuck Cherundolo (1916–2012), American football player and coach
- Steve Cherundolo (born 1979), American soccer player and coach

== See also ==
- Cerundolo, surname
