= Douglas Higgs =

Douglas Higgs FRS
- Born: 13 January 1951 (age 75)
- Awards: Buchanan Medal

Academic work
- Discipline: Haematology
- Sub-discipline: molecular haematology
- Institutions: Weatherall Institute of Molecular Medicine; John Radcliffe Hospital; King's College School
- Main interests: regulation of alpha-globin genetics of alpha-thalassemia

Douglas Roland Higgs FRS (born 13 January 1951) is a Professor of Molecular Haematology at the Weatherall Institute of Molecular Medicine, at the University of Oxford. He is known for his work on the regulation of alpha-globin and the genetics of alpha-thalassemia. He is currently working in understanding the mechanisms by which any mammalian gene is switched on and off during differentiation and development.

== Education ==
He was educated at Alleyn's School and qualified in medicine at King's College Hospital Medical School in 1974, and trained as a haematologist. He became a registrar in Haematology at Kings College Hospital in 1976.

== Research and career ==
He joined the Molecular Haematology Unit of the Medical Research Council at Oxford in 1977. In 1996 he was appointed Ad Hominem Professor of Molecular Haematology. In 2001, he became a director of the MRC Molecular Haematology Unit (MHU). In 2012, Higgs was appointed director of the Weatherall Institute of Molecular Medicine (WIMM). In 2020, Higgs was succeeded as director of the MRC MHU and WIMM by Ketan J. Patel. Higgs is a Senior Kurti Fellow at Brasenose College, Oxford.

== Honours and awards ==
- 1993 Fellow of the Royal College of Physicians
- 1994 Fellow of the Royal College of Pathologists
- 2001 Fellow of the Academy of Medical Sciences
- 2005 Fellow of the Royal Society
- 2013 Buchanan Medal of the Royal Society for "his seminal work on the regulation of the human alpha-globin gene cluster and the role of the ATRX protein in genetic disease."
- 2023 The Genetics Society Medal.

== Works ==
Gibbons, Richard J; Picketts, David J; Villard, Laurent; Higgs, Douglas R (1995). "Mutations in a putative global transcriptional regulator cause X-linked mental retardation with α-thalassemia (ATR-X syndrome)". Cell. 80 (6): 837–845. doi:10.1016/0092-8674(95)90287-2. PMID 7697714. S2CID 16411046.

Tufarelli, Cristina; Stanley, Jackie A Sloane; Garrick, David; Sharpe, Jackie A; Ayyub, Helena; Wood, William G; Higgs, Douglas R (2003). "Transcription of antisense RNA leading to gene silencing and methylation as a novel cause of human genetic disease". Nature Genetics. 34 (2): 157–165. doi:10.1038/ng1157. ISSN 1546-1718. PMID 12730694. S2CID 7226446.

Higgs, D. R.; Goodbourn, S. E. Y.; Lamb, J.; Clegg, J. B.; Weatherall, D. J.; Proudfoot, N. J. (1983). "α-Thalassaemia caused by a polyadenylation signal mutation". Nature. 306 (5941): 398–400. Bibcode:1983Natur.306..398H. doi:10.1038/306398a0. ISSN 1476-4687. PMID 6646217. S2CID 4332750.

Wilkie, Andrew O. M.; Lamb, Janette; Harris, Peter C.; Finney, Roger D.; Higgs, Douglas R. (1990). "A truncated human chromosome 16 associated with α thalassaemia is stabilized by addition of telomeric repeat (TTAGGG)n". Nature. 346 (6287): 868–871. Bibcode:1990Natur.346..868W. doi:10.1038/346868a0. ISSN 1476-4687. PMID 1975428. S2CID 4239520.

Nicholls, R.D.; Fischel-Ghodsian, N.; Higgs, D.R. (1987). "Recombination at the human α-globin gene cluster: Sequence features and topological constraints". Cell. 49 (3): 369–378. doi:10.1016/0092-8674(87)90289-3. PMID 3032452. S2CID 54349888.

De Gobbi, Marco; Viprakasit, Vip; Hughes, Jim R.; Fisher, Chris; Buckle, Veronica J.; Ayyub, Helena; Gibbons, Richard J.; Vernimmen, Douglas; Yoshinaga, Yuko (26 May 2006). "A Regulatory SNP Causes a Human Genetic Disease by Creating a New Transcriptional Promoter". Science. 312 (5777): 1215–1217. Bibcode:2006Sci...312.1215D. doi:10.1126/science.1126431. ISSN 0036-8075. PMID 16728641. S2CID 16044469.

Law, Martin J.; Lower, Karen M.; Voon, Hsiao P.J.; Hughes, Jim R.; Garrick, David; Viprakasit, Vip; Mitson, Matthew; De Gobbi, Marco; Marra, Marco (2010). "ATR-X Syndrome Protein Targets Tandem Repeats and Influences Allele-Specific Expression in a Size-Dependent Manner". Cell. 143 (3): 367–378. doi:10.1016/j.cell.2010.09.023. PMID 21029860.

Hughes, Jim R; Roberts, Nigel; McGowan, Simon; Hay, Deborah; Giannoulatou, Eleni; Lynch, Magnus; De Gobbi, Marco; Taylor, Stephen; Gibbons, Richard (2014). "Analysis of hundreds of cis-regulatory landscapes at high resolution in a single, high-throughput experiment". Nature Genetics. 46 (2): 205–212. doi:10.1038/ng.2871. hdl:2318/144575. ISSN 1546-1718. PMID 24413732. S2CID 205348099.

Higgs, Douglas R.; Gibbons, Richard J.; McDowell, Tarra L.; Raman, Sundhya; O'Rourke, Delia M.; Garrick, David; Ayyub, Helena (2000). "Mutations in ATRX, encoding a SWI/SNF-like protein, cause diverse changes in the pattern of DNA methylation". Nature Genetics. 24 (4): 368–371. doi:10.1038/74191. ISSN 1546-1718. PMID 10742099. S2CID 8847855.

Hay, Deborah; Hughes, Jim R; Babbs, Christian; Davies, James O J; Graham, Bryony J; Hanssen, Lars L P; Kassouf, Mira T; Oudelaar, A Marieke; Sharpe, Jacqueline A (2016). "Genetic dissection of the α-globin super-enhancer in vivo". Nature Genetics. 48 (8): 895–903. doi:10.1038/ng.3605. ISSN 1546-1718. PMC 5058437. PMID 27376235.
