= Andrew McMichael =

Andrew McMichael FRS FMedSci KBE
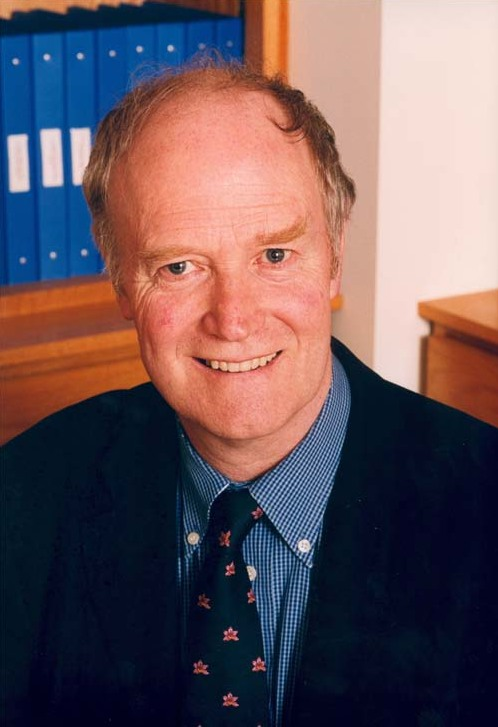
- Born: 8 November 1943; London
- Education: Gonville and Caius College; National Institute for Medical Research
- Occupations: Medical doctor; immunologist; university teacher
- Employers: Stanford University; University of Oxford (2016–); Weatherall Institute of Molecular Medicine
- Father: John McMichael
- Scientific career
- Fields: Immunology, medicine, molecular medicine
- Workplaces: Weatherall Institute of Molecular Medicine; Stanford University; University of Oxford (2016–)
- Thesis: The clonal expression of antibody-forming cells.
- Doctoral advisor: Brigitte Askonas
- Academic advisors: Hugh McDevitt
- Doctoral students: Malegapuru Makgoba, Suranjith Seneviratne

Sir Andrew James McMichael (born 8 November 1943) is an immunologist, Professor of Molecular Medicine, and previously Director of the Weatherall Institute of Molecular Medicine at the University of Oxford. He is particularly known for his work on T cell responses to viral infections such as influenza and HIV.

== Early life and education ==
McMichael was born in London on 8 November 1943 to Sir John McMichael and Joan Catherine. He went to school at St Pauls and then to the University of Cambridge at Gonville and Caius College to study medicine (1962–1968). He went on to complete a PhD at the National Institute for Medical Research supervised by 'Ita' Brigitte Askonas and Alan Williamson. His thesis, published in 1975, is entitled The clonal expression of antibody-forming cells.

== Career and research ==
After his PhD McMichael completed his postdoctoral research supervised by Hugh McDevitt at Stanford University. In 1977 he returned to the UK to study the T cell response to HIV infection. His research group have created two HIV vaccines which were tested in phase I clinical trials. McMichael became director of the Weatherall Institute of Molecular Medicine in 2000, and remained so until 2012. He founded the MRC Human Immunology Unit in 1998 as honorary director until 2010.

McMichael has supervised over 55 DPhil students over his career, many of whom have gone on to become leading immunologists themselves:

- Douglas F. Nixon, Professor of Immunology in Medicine, Weill Cornell Medical College.
- Malegapuru Makgoba, Professor of Immunology and former Vice-Chancellor & Principal of the University of KwaZulu-Natal.
- Matilu Mwau Professor and Executive Director of the Consortium for National Health Research
- Paul Bowness, Professor of Experimental Rheymatology
- Awen Gallimore, Professor of Cancer Immunology
- Paul Klenerman, Sidney Truelove Professor of Gastroenterology
- Dan Barouch, Professor of Medicine and Director of the Center for Virology and Vaccine Research at Harvard Medical School
- Sophie Hambleton, Professor of Paediatrics & Immunology
- Suranjith Seneviratne, Professor, Director of the Centre for Mast Cell Disorders and the President of the UK-Sri Lanka Immunology Foundation.
- Ling-Pei Ho, Professor of Respiratory Immunology

In addition McMichael supervised postdoctoral researchers, including Tomáš Hanke (Professor of Vaccine Immunology), and Sarah Rowland-Jones (Professor of Immunology).

== Awards and honours ==
- Fellow of the Royal Society (1992)
- Member of the European Molecular Biology Organisation (2004)
- Novartis Prize for Basic Immunology (1998)
- Rose Payne Distinguished Scientist award (1998)
- Fellow of the Academy of Medical Sciences (1998)
- Sheikh Hamdan Award (2000)
- Ambuj Nath Bose Prize, Royal College of Physicians (2001)
- Ernst Chain Prize (2006)
- Nature/NESTA Award for Lifetime Mentoring (2006)
- Knighthood for services to medical science (2008)

== Personal life ==
In 1968 McMichael married Kathryn 'Kate' Elizabeth Cross, they have two sons and one daughter. McMichael enjoys walking and skiing at his house in La Salle les Alpes, France.

== Notable works ==
McMichael, A. J.; Ting, A.; Zweerink, H. J.; Askonas, Brigitte A. (1977). "HLA restriction of cell-mediated lysis of influenza virus-infected human cells". Nature. 270 (5637): 524–526. Bibcode:1977Natur.270..524M. doi:10.1038/270524a0. ISSN 1476-4687. PMID 593371. S2CID 4173925.

McMichael, A. J.; Gotch, F. M.; Noble, G. R.; Beare, P. A. (7 July 1983). "Cytotoxic T-cell immunity to influenza". The New England Journal of Medicine. 309 (1): 13–17. doi:10.1056/NEJM198307073090103. ISSN 0028-4793. PMID 6602294.

Townsend, A. R.; Rothbard, J.; Gotch, F. M.; Bahadur, G.; Wraith, D.; McMichael, A. J. (28 March 1986). "The epitopes of influenza nucleoprotein recognized by cytotoxic T lymphocytes can be defined with short synthetic peptides". Cell. 44 (6): 959–968. doi:10.1016/0092-8674(86)90019-x. ISSN 0092-8674. PMID 2420472. S2CID 23606100.

Phillips, R. E.; Rowland-Jones, S.; Nixon, D. F.; Gotch, F. M.; Edwards, J. P.; Ogunlesi, A. O.; Elvin, J. G.; Rothbard, J. A.; Bangham, C. R. (12 December 1991). "Human immunodeficiency virus genetic variation that can escape cytotoxic T cell recognition". Nature. 354 (6353): 453–459. Bibcode:1991Natur.354..453P. doi:10.1038/354453a0. ISSN 0028-0836. PMID 1721107. S2CID 4257933.

Altman, J. D.; Moss, P. A.; Goulder, P. J.; Barouch, D. H.; McHeyzer-Williams, M. G.; Bell, J. I.; McMichael, A. J.; Davis, M. M. (4 October 1996). "Phenotypic analysis of antigen-specific T lymphocytes". Science. 274 (5284): 94–96. Bibcode:1996Sci...274...94A. doi:10.1126/science.274.5284.94. ISSN 0036-8075. PMID 8810254. S2CID 12667633.

Goonetilleke, Nilu; Liu, Michael K. P.; Salazar-Gonzalez, Jesus F.; Ferrari, Guido; Giorgi, Elena; Ganusov, Vitaly V.; Keele, Brandon F.; Learn, Gerald H.; Turnbull, Emma L. (8 June 2009). "The first T cell response to transmitted/founder virus contributes to the control of acute viremia in HIV-1 infection". The Journal of Experimental Medicine. 206 (6): 1253–1272. doi:10.1084/jem.20090365. ISSN 1540-9538. PMC 2715063. PMID 19487423.

Liu, Michael K. P.; Hawkins, Natalie; Ritchie, Adam J.; Ganusov, Vitaly V.; Whale, Victoria; Brackenridge, Simon; Li, Hui; Pavlicek, Jeffrey W.; Cai, Fangping (January 2013). "Vertical T cell immunodominance and epitope entropy determine HIV-1 escape". The Journal of Clinical Investigation. 123 (1): 380–393. doi:10.1172/JCI65330. ISSN 1558-8238. PMC 3533301. PMID 23221345.

Fellay, Jacques; Shianna, Kevin V.; Ge, Dongliang; Colombo, Sara; Ledergerber, Bruno; Weale, Mike; Zhang, Kunlin; Gumbs, Curtis; Castagna, Antonella (17 August 2007). "A Whole-Genome Association Study of Major Determinants for Host Control of HIV-1". Science. 317 (5840): 944–947. Bibcode:2007Sci...317..944F. doi:10.1126/science.1143767. ISSN 0036-8075. PMC 1991296. PMID 17641165.

Hill, Adrian V. S.; Allsopp, Catherine E. M.; Kwiatkowski, Dominic; Anstey, Nicholas M.; Twumasi, Patrick; Rowe, Pamela A.; Bennett, Stephen; Brewster, David; McMichael, Andrew J. (1991). "Common West African HLA antigens are associated with protection from severe malaria". Nature. 352 (6336): 595–600. Bibcode:1991Natur.352..595H. doi:10.1038/352595a0. ISSN 1476-4687. PMID 1865923.

Braud, Veronique M.; Allan, David S. J.; O'Callaghan, Christopher A.; Söderström, Kalle; D'Andrea, Annalisa; Ogg, Graham S.; Lazetic, Sasha; Young, Neil T.; Bell, John I. (1998). "HLA-E binds to natural killer cell receptors CD94/NKG2A, B and C". Nature. 391 (6669): 795–799. Bibcode:1998Natur.391..795B. doi:10.1038/35869. ISSN 1476-4687. PMID 9486650. S2CID 4379457.

McMichael, Andrew J.; Rowland-Jones, Sarah L. (19 April 2001). "Cellular immune responses to HIV". Nature. 410 (6831): 980–987. Bibcode:2001Natur.410..980M. doi:10.1038/35073658. PMID 11309628.

Appay, Victor; Dunbar, P. Rod; Callan, Margaret; Klenerman, Paul; Gillespie, Geraldine M.A.; Papagno, Laura; Ogg, Graham S.; King, Abigail; Lechner, Franziska (2002). "Memory CD8+ T cells vary in differentiation phenotype in different persistent virus infections". Nature Medicine. 8 (4): 379–385. doi:10.1038/nm0402-379. ISSN 1546-170X. PMID 11927944. S2CID 22346636.

McMichael, Andrew J.; Borrow, Persephone; Tomaras, Georgia D.; Goonetilleke, Nilu; Haynes, Barton F. (2010). "The immune response during acute HIV-1 infection: clues for vaccine development". Nature Reviews Immunology. 10 (1): 11–23. doi:10.1038/nri2674. ISSN 1474-1741. PMC 3119211. PMID 20010788.
