= Bethan Psaila =

British haematologist

- Education: University of Cambridge; Imperial College London; Weill Cornell Medical College
- Scientific career
- Workplaces: University of Oxford
- Website: https://www.rdm.ox.ac.uk/people/bethan-psaila

Bethan Psaila is a physician-scientist known for work in hematopoiesis, megakaryocyte/platelet biology and myeloproliferative neoplasms (MPNs). She is Professor of Hematology at the University of Oxford, a Cancer Research UK funded Senior Fellow, and a Senior Fellow of New College. In 2021, she co-founded Alethiomics, a drug-discovery company.

== Education ==
Psaila received her undergraduate and medical training at Clare College, Cambridge and University College London Hospitals. She went on to pursue a PhD degree at Imperial College London and Weill-Cornell University Medical School in New York, where she studied the role of megakaryocytes in cancer metastasis. She completed her specialty training in hematology at the Hammersmith Hospital as an NIHR Academic Clinical Lecturer at Imperial College London. Psaila was granted a prestigious Wellcome Clinical Career Development Fellowship, which supported further postdoctoral research in David Bodine's laboratory at the National Human Genome Research Institute in Maryland and with Professors Adam Mead and Irene Roberts at the MRC Weatherall Institute of Molecular Medicine, University of Oxford. She then obtained a Cancer Research UK Advanced Clinician Scientist to establish her own laboratory in the MRC WIMM in August 2019.

== Research ==
Psaila is Professor of Hematology at the University of Oxford and serves as a Group Leader at the MRC Weatherall Institute of Molecular Medicine and Associate Member of the Oxford Ludwig Institute for Cancer Research. Her research focuses on the tumor microenvironment in blood cancers:

- Interactions in normal and malignant hematopoiesis – Investigating the interactions between blood stem cells, megakaryocytes, and the stroma in both normal and malignant hematopoiesis.
- Bone Marrow Organoids – Development and application of human bone marrow organoids to study hematopoiesis and validate therapeutic targets in the relevant tissue microenvironment.
- Selective targeting – Developing novel strategies to selectively target disease-driving cancer stem cells and pathological megakaryocytes in myelofibrosis, a severe bone marrow malignancy.
- Platelet biology and early detection – Exploring the utility of platelet-associated DNA fragments in cancer detection and pre-natal diagnosis.

== Honours and awards ==
In 2015, Psaila was awarded a Wellcome Career Development Fellowship to use single cell techniques to study molecular mechanisms of abnormal megakaryocyte development in myelofibrosis.

In 2017, Psaila won a prestigious Fellowship at the L'Oréal-UNESCO UK and Ireland for Women in Science.

In 2019, Psaila received a Cancer Research UK Advanced Clinician Scientist Fellowship.

In 2021, Psaila received the RDM-WIMM Sir Andrew McMichael Award for Excellent Supervision and Mentorship, recognizing her exceptional mentorship and support of trainees.

In 2024, Psaila was awarded a Senior Fellowship funded by Cancer Research UK in partnership with the Rosetrees Trust. This fellowship supports her research into the progression of cancers from indolent to advanced stages and the development of new therapies.

In 2025, Psaila was awarded the title of Full Professor.

In 2026, Psaila was awarded the ISEH Janet Rowley Award.

== Selected publications ==
- Li, R., Colombo, M., Wang, G., Rodriguez-Romera, A., Benlabiod, C., Jooss, N. J., ... & Psaila, B. (2024). A proinflammatory stem cell niche drives myelofibrosis through a targetable galectin-1 axis. Science translational medicine, 16(768), eadj7552.
- Olijnik, A. A., Rodriguez-Romera, A., Wong, Z. C., Shen, Y., Reyat, J. S., Jooss, N. J., ... & Psaila, B., Khan, A. O. (2024). Generating human bone marrow organoids for disease modeling and drug discovery. Nature Protocols, 1-30.
- Khan, A. O., Rodriguez-Romera, A., Reyat, J. S., Olijnik, A. A., Colombo, M., Wang, G., ... & Psaila, B. (2023). Human bone marrow organoids for disease modeling, discovery, and validation of therapeutic targets in hematologic malignancies. Cancer discovery, 13(2), 364-385.
- Psaila, B., Wang, G., Rodriguez-Meira, A., Li, R., Heuston, E. F., Murphy, L., ... & Mead, A. J. (2020). Single-cell analyses reveal megakaryocyte-biased hematopoiesis in myelofibrosis and identify mutant clone-specific targets. Molecular cell, 78(3), 477-492.
