= Frederick Warner (engineer) =

British chemical engineer

Sir Frederick Edward Warner
- Born: 31 March 1910; Greenwich, London, England
- Died: 3 July 2010 (aged 100)
- Occupation: Chemical engineer
- Awards: Buchanan Medal (1982)

Sir Frederick Edward Warner FRS, FREng (31 March 1910 – 3 July 2010) was a British chemical engineer.

He was knighted in 1968, FRS 1976, Leverhulme Medal 1978, Buchanan Medal 1982. He was a founding Fellow of the Royal Academy of Engineering. Warner also received an Honorary Doctorate from Heriot-Watt University in 1978.

In 1986, Warner assembled a group of experts, all aged over 65, to visit the stricken Chernobyl reactor. On returning to Britain he proposed the formation of a permanent task force made up of older scientists who would be on hand to enter contaminated areas after serious nuclear accidents to make initial damage assessments. As a result, Volunteers for Ionising Radiation (VIR) was formed and incorporated into the emergency provisions of the Order of St John.

Warner died on 3 July 2010 at the age of 100.

== Legacy ==
Warner's chemical engineering legacy is remembered through the Sir Frederick Warner prize, a biennial award presented by IChemE (the Institution of Chemical Engineers) to recognise an individual in the early stages of their career that has shown exceptional promise in the field of sustainable chemical process technology, nuclear technology or in making chemical engineering more accessible to a wider scientific community.
