= Irwin McLean =

Emeritus Professor of Genetic Medicine

Irwin McLean FRS FRSE FMedSci
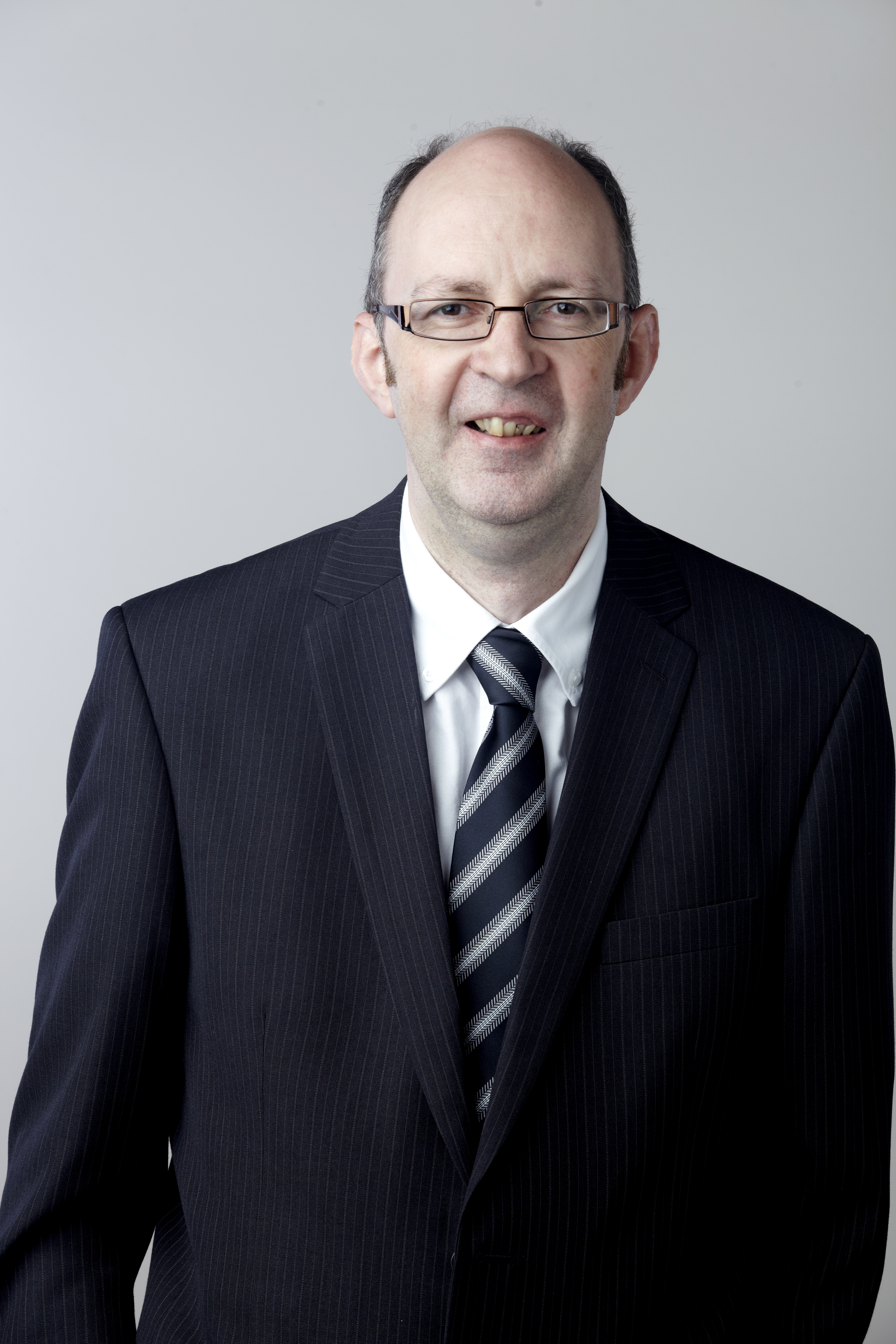
- Born: William Henry Irwin McLean; 9 January 1963 (age 63); Ballymoney, County Antrim
- Education: Queen's University of Belfast
- Awards: FRS (2014); FRSE; FMedSci (2009)
- Scientific career
- Fields: Inherited skin diseases; Atopic eczema; Keratinocyte biology; Drug discovery; Gene silencing therapy; Filaggrin; Keratins; Dermatology
- Workplaces: University of Dundee
- Thesis: Electrophoretic and immunological analysis of proteins in the muscular dystrophies (1988)
- Website: lifesci.dundee.ac.uk/people/irwin-mclean

William Henry Irwin McLean (born 1963) is an Irish geneticist who is emeritus professor of genetic medicine, at the School of Life Sciences, University of Dundee.

== Education ==
McLean was educated at Queen's University of Belfast where he was awarded a Bachelor of Science degree with honours in microbiology in 1985 followed by a PhD in 1988 for electrophoretic and immunological analysis of proteins involved in muscular dystrophy.

== Research ==
The McLean Lab investigates genetic disorders that affect the cells and tissues of the epithelium and is funded by the Medical Research Council (MRC) and the Wellcome Trust.

== Awards and honours ==
McLean was elected a Fellow of the Royal Society of Edinburgh in 2005 and of the Academy of Medical Sciences in 2009.

McLean was elected a fellow of the Royal Society in 2014. His nomination reads:

Irwin McLean is distinguished his major contributions to our understanding of the genetic basis of heritable skin diseases. Of particular note is his discovery that null mutations in filaggrin, which are carried by 10% of the population, not only cause the dry, flaky skin condition ichthyosis vulgaris but also strongly predispose individuals to the most common skin disorder, atopic eczema, and the associated phenotypes of atopic asthma, allergy and hay fever. This research has revolutionised the field by showing that a skin barrier defect, rather than an immunological defect, is the primary cause of eczema and focused attention on improving barrier function to treat these common diseases. He was also the first to map and identify the causative genes for a number of monogenic cell fragility disorders affecting the epidermis, its appendages and other epithelial tissues, including pachyonychia congenita, muscular dystrophy with epidermolysis bullosa simplex and Meesmann corneal dystrophy. His work has established that a primary function of the intermediate filament cytoskeleton, its attachment structures and modifying proteins is to provide epithelial tissues with mechanical strength.
