= Michael Waterfield =

British biochemist (1941–2023)

Michael Derek Waterfield FRS (14 May 1941 – 11 May 2023) was a British biochemist and cancer biologist.

== Biography ==
Michael Derek Waterfield was born on 14 May 1941. He was elected to the Royal Society in 1991, and awarded its Buchanan Medal in 2002 "for his exceptional skill in protein biochemistry which have [sic] transformed our understanding of signal transduction, and the subversion of cellular signalling pathways in cancer". Waterfield died on 11 May 2023, at the age of 81.
