= Alain Townsend =

British professor and virologist

Professor Alain Townsend FRS FRCP
- Education: St Mary's Hospital, National Institute for Medical Research
- Awards: Canada Gairdner International Award (2000); William B. Coley Award (1989); Louis-Jeantet Prize for Medicine (1992)
- Scientific career
- Fields: Immunology
- Workplaces: University of Oxford; Howard Hughes Medical Institute; Linacre College; University of Oxford
- Thesis: Recognition by influenza virus specific cytotoxic T cell clones
- Doctoral advisor: Brigitte Askonas
- Website: www.rdm.ox.ac.uk/people/alain-townsend

Alain Townsend is a British virologist who is a Professor of Medicine in the Weatherall Institute of Molecular Medicine at Oxford University. His laboratory studies virology, mainly influenza, but more recently ebola.

After graduating from St Mary's Hospital, London, he went to the National Institute for Medical Research to study immunology. He received his PhD in 1984, supervised by Brigitte Askonas.

== Awards ==
- 1989 William B. Coley Award
- 1992 Fellow of the Royal Society
- 1992 Louis-Jeantet Prize for Medicine (1992)
- 2000 Gairdner Foundation International Award
