= Nature Immunology =

- Discipline: Immunology
- Language: English
- Edited by: Jamie D. K. Wilson

Publication details
- History: 2000–present
- Publisher: Nature Publishing Group
- Frequency: Monthly
- Open access: Hybrid
- Impact factor: 26.5 (2025)

Standard abbreviations
- ISO 4: Nat. Immunol.

Indexing
- CODEN: NIAMCZ
- ISSN: 1529-2908 (print); 1529-2916 (web)
- LCCN: 00211732
- OCLC no.: 909622446

Links
- Journal homepage; Online access; Online archive

Nature Immunology is a monthly peer-reviewed scientific journal covering immunology. It was established in 2000, as an expansion of the Nature family of journals. The editor-in-chief is Jamie D. K. Wilson.

According to the Journal Citation Reports, the journal has a 2021 impact factor of 31.250, ranking it 4th out of 161 journals in the category "Immunology".
