= Ketan J. Patel =

British–Kenyan scientist

Ketan J. Patel FRS FMedSci MRCP
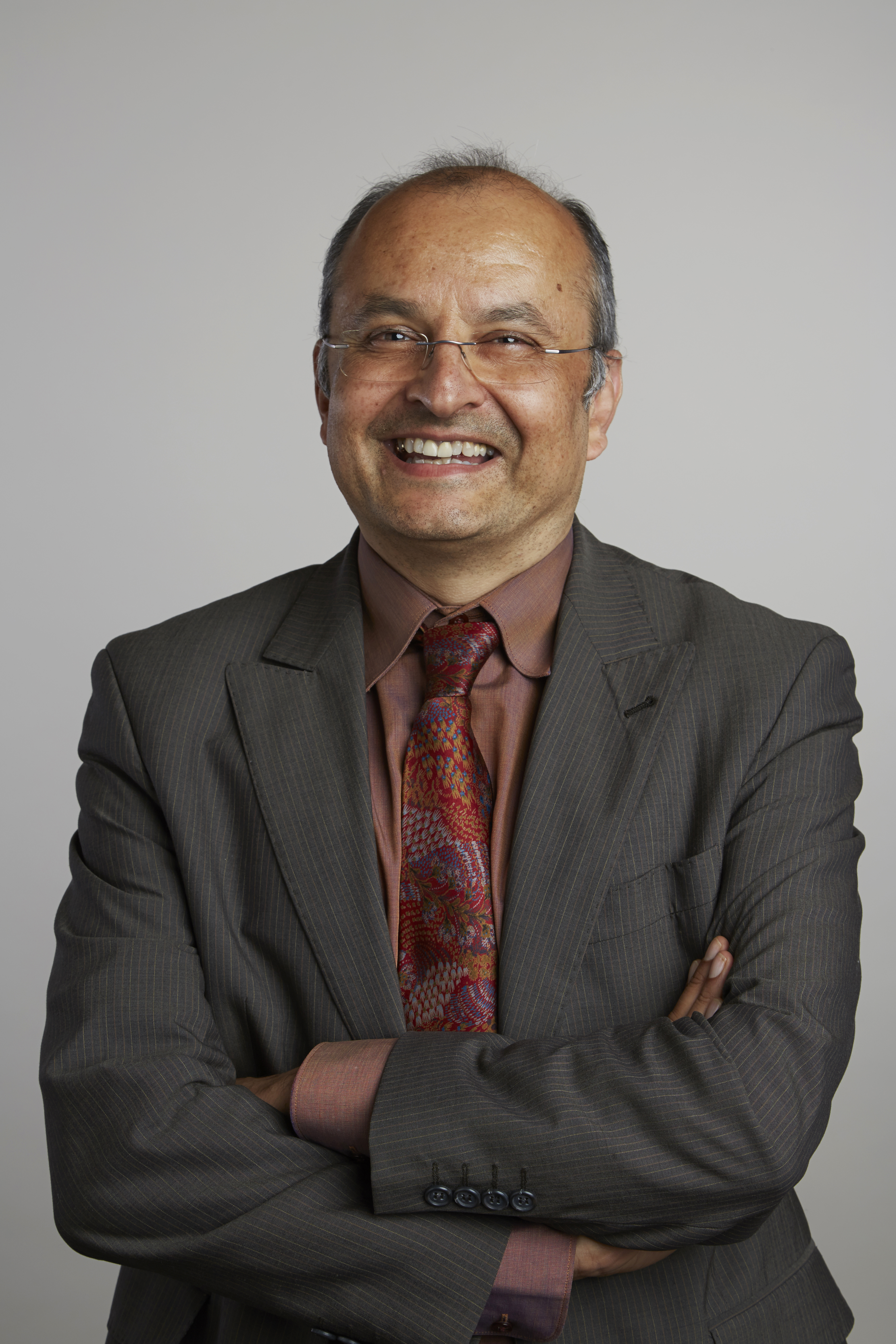
- Patel in 2015
- Born: Ketan Jayakrishna Patel; Nairobi, Kenya
- Education: Banda School; Marlborough College
- Alma mater: University of London (MBBS); University of Cambridge (PhD)
- Awards: EMBO Member
- Scientific career
- Fields: Cancer; Medical genetics; Fanconi anaemia
- Workplaces: MRC Weatherall Institute of Molecular Medicine; John Radcliffe Hospital; University of Oxford; MRC Laboratory of Molecular Biology
- Thesis: Antigen presentation by the B cell antigen receptor (1994)
- Doctoral advisor: Michael Neuberger
- Website: www2.mrc-lmb.cam.ac.uk/group-leaders/n-to-s/kj-patel/

Ketan Jayakrishna Patel is a British–Kenyan scientist who is Director of the MRC Weatherall Institute of Molecular Medicine and the MRC Molecular Haematology Unit at the University of Oxford. Until 2020 he was a tenured principal investigator at the Medical Research Council (MRC) Laboratory of Molecular Biology (LMB).

== Education and early life ==
Patel is of Gujarati Indian origin and was born in Nairobi, Kenya. His early education took place in his home country at Hospital Hill Primary School and Banda Preparatory School. In 1976, Patel left Kenya to continue his secondary education at Marlborough College in Wiltshire. He subsequently went to medical school at the Royal Free Hospital and the University of London (1980–1985) where he qualified as a doctor with distinctions in Medicine and Surgery.

Patel originally trained as a gastroenterologist but also was awarded an MRC training fellowship to work with Michael Neuberger FRS at the MRC Laboratory of Molecular Biology (1989–1993). He completed a PhD in which he conducted research to understand the role the membrane bound form of the antibody molecule.

== Career and Research ==
After his PhD, Patel was awarded an MRC Clinician Scientist Fellowship and started working with Ashok Venkitaraman (1995–1998) where he contributed to the discovery that the BRCA2 protein functions in repairing damaged DNA. Patel eventually joined the LMB as a tenure track group leader (1999–2007) and was later on promoted to tenured principal investigator at the LMB (2007–2020). He was appointed professor of Molecular Medicine and Stem Cell Genomics in 2017. He also served on the Life Sciences jury for the Infosys Prize in 2018 and 2019.

In 2020 Patel was appointed as Director of the MRC Weatherall Institute of Molecular Medicine and the MRC Molecular Haematology Unit at the University of Oxford.

Patel's research is mainly concerned with how living cells repair DNA crosslinks. These lesions cause the two opposing strands of DNA to be covalently bound together. Such crosslinks are lethal to cells since they would prevent DNA from being copied (DNA replication) or for the genes it carries to be read (DNA transcription). DNA crosslinks are caused by numerous anti-cancer drugs (such as cisplatin), but they also must arise naturally since individuals carrying a genetic defect in crosslink repair suffer from the illness Fanconi anaemia. This devastating inherited illness leads to congenital defects, progressive loss of blood production and an enormous lifetime risk of certain cancers.

Patel's research on the Fanconi pathway has provided key molecular insights into how cells remove DNA crosslinks and, most recently, his lab discovered that reactive aldehydes are the likely natural agents that produce them. Aldehydes are ubiquitous metabolites, arising not only from many metabolic pathways but also when cells process alcohol. His lab showed that mammals use a two-tier protection mechanism to counteract aldehydes, consisting of (1) enzymatic clearance of aldehydes by aldehyde dehydrogenases and (2) the Fanconi DNA repair pathway (see Figure). Although Fanconi anaemia is a very rare condition, genetic deficiency of this two-tier protection mechanism is actually very common in man: up to 500 million Asians are deficient in first tier protection due to mutations in the gene ALDH2.

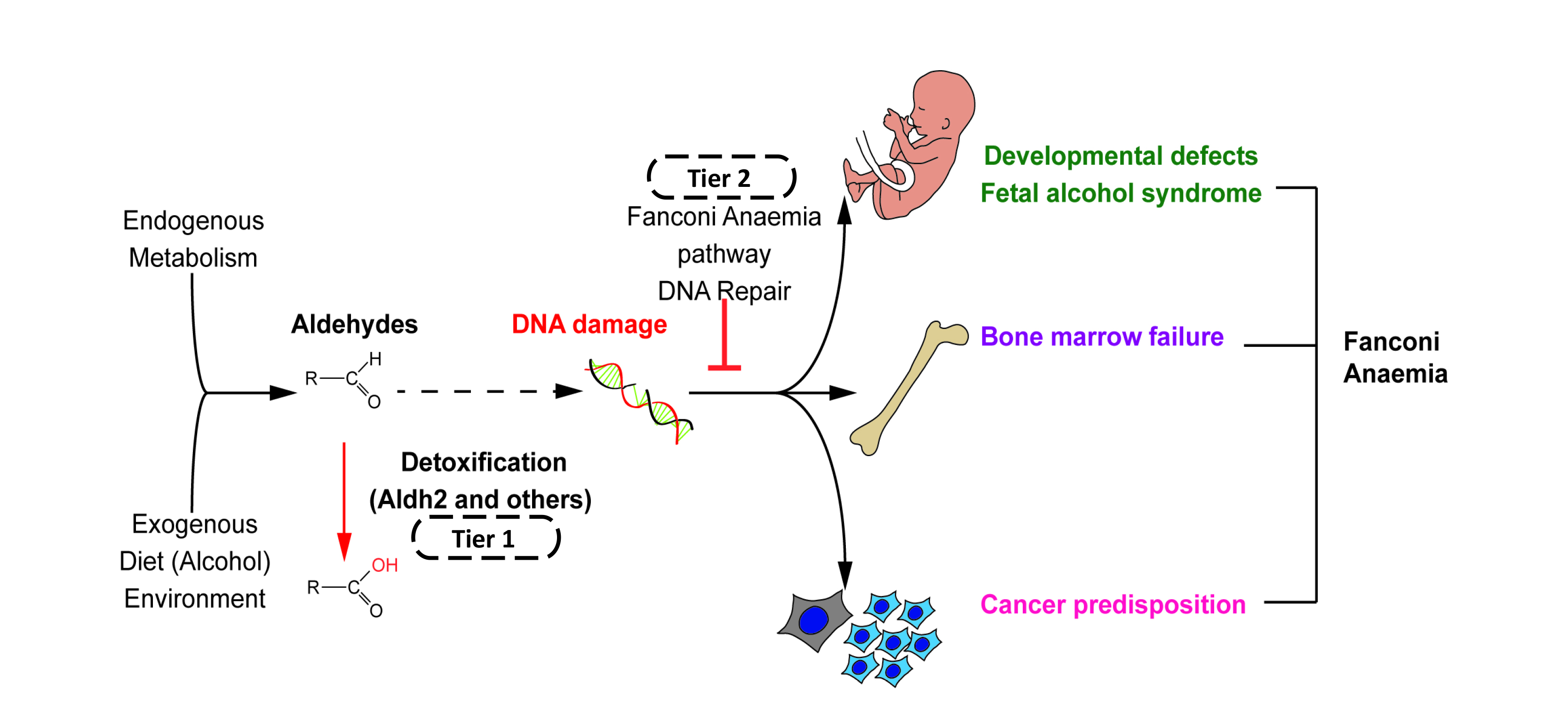
Two-tier protection against reactive aldehydes

=== Awards and honours ===
Patel was elected to Research Fellow of Gonville and Caius College, Cambridge (1996–2000). He was also awarded the Max Perutz Prize for his PhD research at the LMB (1994), a prize from the Children with Cancer Research Fund for breakthroughs into the causes of childhood leukaemia (2005) and the Award of Merit from the Fanconi Anemia Research Fund. In 2013, Patel was elected EMBO Membership and a Fellow of the Academy of Medical Sciences (FMedSci). In 2015, he was elected fellow of the Royal Society of London (FRS). His certificate for election to Fellow of the Royal Society (FRS) in 2015 reads:

KJ Patel has made seminal discoveries on the Fanconi pathway of DNA repair. Deficiencies in this pathway lead to defective development, stem cell attrition and cancer in humans. Patel has unveiled the primary role of the Fanconi pathway in resolving DNA damage caused by aldehydes (whether generated by endogenous metabolism or though oxidation of ingested substances such as ethanol). He has also advanced our knowledge of the molecular mechanism of action of the pathway and thrown light on its roles in preserving blood stem cells as well as in protection from cancer.

In 2026, KJ Patel received the Buchanan Medal, which recognises distinguished contributions to the biomedical sciences.

Patel derived the most pleasure when he received a lifetime achievement award from the Fanconi Anemia research fund – a charity set up by the families of those affected by this devastating illness.
