= Stanley Peart =

British scientist (1922–2019)

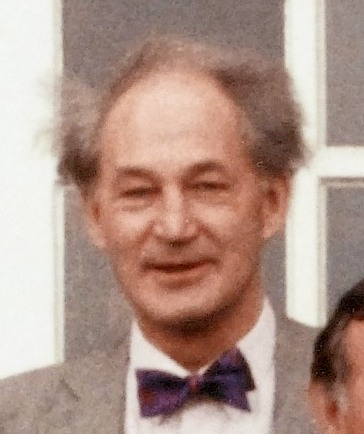
- Peart in 1987
- Born: William Stanley Peart; 31 March 1922; South Shields, County Durham, England
- Died: 14 March 2019 (aged 96); Highgate, London, England
- Father: Jack Peart
- Awards: FRS (1969); Buchanan Medal (2000)
- Scientific career
- Fields: clinical research

Sir William Stanley Peart (31 March 1922 – 14 March 2019) was a British medical doctor and clinical researcher who was first to demonstrate the release of noradrenaline after the stimulation of sympathetic nerves.

== Early life and education ==
Peart was the son of footballer and Fulham Football Club manager John George Peart and Margaret Joan (née Fraser).

Peart was educated at King's College School Bradford Grammar School and St Mary's Hospital Medical School (now part of Imperial College School of Medicine).

== Work ==
Peart's main research interest lay in renal medicine and in particular, a hormone system that regulates blood pressure and water called the renin–angiotensin system.

He was the first to purify the peptide hormone angiotensin and determine its structure. He later isolated the enzyme renin — which catalyses the production of angiotensin — and carried out work to investigate the control of its release in the body. Peart is also acknowledged as being the driving force behind the development of the renal transplant programme at St Mary's Hospital in Paddington, London.

Peart was Chair of the Medical Research Society for more than a decade and later a member of the Medical Research Council. He was also a trustee of the Wellcome Trust, where he headed their first clinical panel.

== Awards and honours ==
Peart was elected a Fellow of the Royal Society (FRS) in 1969. He was knighted in 1985. He was elected a member of the Academia Europaea in 1989. In 1998, he was an inaugural Fellow of the Academy of Medical Sciences. He was awarded the Buchanan Medal of the Royal Society in 2000 "for his contribution to the foundations of understanding of the renin angiotensin system in particular through his seminal work on the isolation and determination of the structure of angiotensin, purification of renin, and subsequent studies on the control of renin release".

== Personal life ==
In 1947, Peart married Peggy Parkes, a nurse at St Mary's Hospital.

== Interviews ==
Peart, Stanley; Blythe, Max (1993). "Sir Stanley Peart FRS in interview with Dr Max Blythe: Interview 1, Part 1". Medical Sciences Video Archive. Oxford Brookes University. doi:10.24384/000236.

Peart, Stanley; Blythe, Max (1993). "Sir Stanley Peart FRS in interview with Dr Max Blythe: Interview 1, Part 2". Medical Sciences Video Archive. Oxford Brookes University. doi:10.24384/000057.

Peart, Stanley; Blythe, Max (1994). "Sir Stanley Peart FRS in interview with Dr Max Blythe: Interview 2". Medical Sciences Video Archive. Oxford Brookes University. doi:10.24384/000055.

Peart, Stanley; Asconas, Ita (1994). "Sir Stanley Peart FRS in interview with Dr Ita Askonas FRS: Interview 3". Medical Sciences Video Archive. Oxford Brookes University. doi:10.24384/000234.

Peart, Stanley; Blythe, Max (1995). "Sir Stanley Peart FRS in interview with Dr Max Blythe: Interview 4". Medical Sciences Video Archive. Oxford Brookes University. doi:10.24384/000056.

Peart, Stanley; Asconas, Ita (1995). "Sir Stanley Peart FRS in interview with Dr Max Blythe: Interview 5". Medical Sciences Video Archive. Oxford Brookes University. doi:10.24384/000235.
