= Suranjith Seneviratne =

Sri Lankan medical doctor

Suranjith Seneviratne is a doctor from Sri Lanka who practices in allergology and immunology.

== Education ==
Seneviratne completed his basic Medical Degree with First Class Honours, eight distinctions and ten gold medals and was his year's valedictorian. He earned his Medical Degree in Internal Medicine and attended John Radcliffe Hospital in Oxford for training in Clinical Immunology and Allergy. He completed a DPhil in Molecular Immunology and Allergy at the Weatherall Institute of Molecular Medicine, University of Oxford as a Commonwealth Scholar.

== Professional activity ==
Currently a Consultant in Clinical Immunology and Allergy at the Royal Free Hospital and University College London which is the largest Primary Immunodeficiency Centre in Europe. Seneviratne was a Consultant and Lead Clinician in Clinical Immunology and Allergy at St Mary's Hospital. Prior to this he also was in Imperial College London, which is a world renowned Allergy and Immunology Centre, and the birthplace of the widely practiced procedure of Allergen Immunotherapy over 100 years ago.

Seneviratne has also been appointed as the Director of Centre for Mast Cell Disorders and as the President of the UK-Sri Lanka Immunology Foundation, an organisation that contributes towards the Immunology and Allergy education in Sri Lanka. He is one of the leading authorities in the world on the diagnosis and management of Histamine and Mast Cell related disorders and has managed Mast Cell/ Histamine/ Immunology/ Allergy aspects of over 1100 patients with Ehlers–Danlos syndrome in both the UK and Asia.

== Publications ==
Seneviratne is the author of over 134 journal publications and was one of the principal investigators in the Pan-European study of adult Food Allergy (EUROPREVALL) in the UK. Furthermore, he has been an author of research articles published in high impact journals such as Nature Medicine, Journal of Experimental Medicine, Blood, The Journal of Allergy and Clinical Immunology and the Journal of Clinical Investigation and Allergy. He is currently the Principal Investigator of the STILLPAD-UK study, a prospective study of lung disease in Immunodeficiency. He directs the Gastrointestinal Immunology and Cancer Research Group at the Department of Surgery, Faculty of Medicine at the University of Colombo, Sri Lanka and is a member of the NIHR Bio-resource Genetic study on Primary Immunodeficiency patients Seneviratne is also involved in several molecular genetic studies on patients with Hyper IgM syndrome, LRBA deficiency, CTLA4 Haploinsufficiency, Hyper IgE syndrome, CVID, Complement deficiencies, Food Allergy and Mast Cell Activation Disorder. In addition Seneviratne has also contributed/involved in the following publications:

- Respiratory Infections and Antibiotic Usage in Common Variable Immunodeficiency
- Epidemiology, Pathogenesis and Treatment of Ulcerative Colitis in South Asia
- Crohn's disease in South Asia
- Mast cell disorders in Ehlers–Danlos syndrome
- Mini-review: Can non-human leucocyte antigen genes determine susceptibility to severe dengue syndromes?

== Affiliations ==
Professor Seneviratne is a member of a following organisations:

- Royal College of Physicians
- Royal College of Pathologists
- Ceylon College of Physicians
- British Society of Immunology
- British Society of Allergy and Clinical Immunology
- European Academy of Allergy and Clinical Immunology
- American Academy of Allergy and Clinical Immunology
- Clinical Immunology Society
- European Society of Immunodeficiency

== Known for ==
- Food Allergy
- Urticia
- Mast cell or Histamine disorders
- Low lymphocyte counts or low immunoglobulin G, A or M level
- Inflammatory conditions – involving several systems
  - Vasculitis
  - SLE
  - Other Autoimmune disorders
- Drug Allergy
- Angioedema
- Allergic Rhinitis and de-sensitisation
- Suspected Immunodeficiency disorders
- Allergic Asthma
- Evaluation of a patient's immune factors
- Recurrent chest or sinus infections
