= Weatherall Institute of Molecular Medicine =

British medical research institute

MRC Weatherall Institute of Molecular Medicine
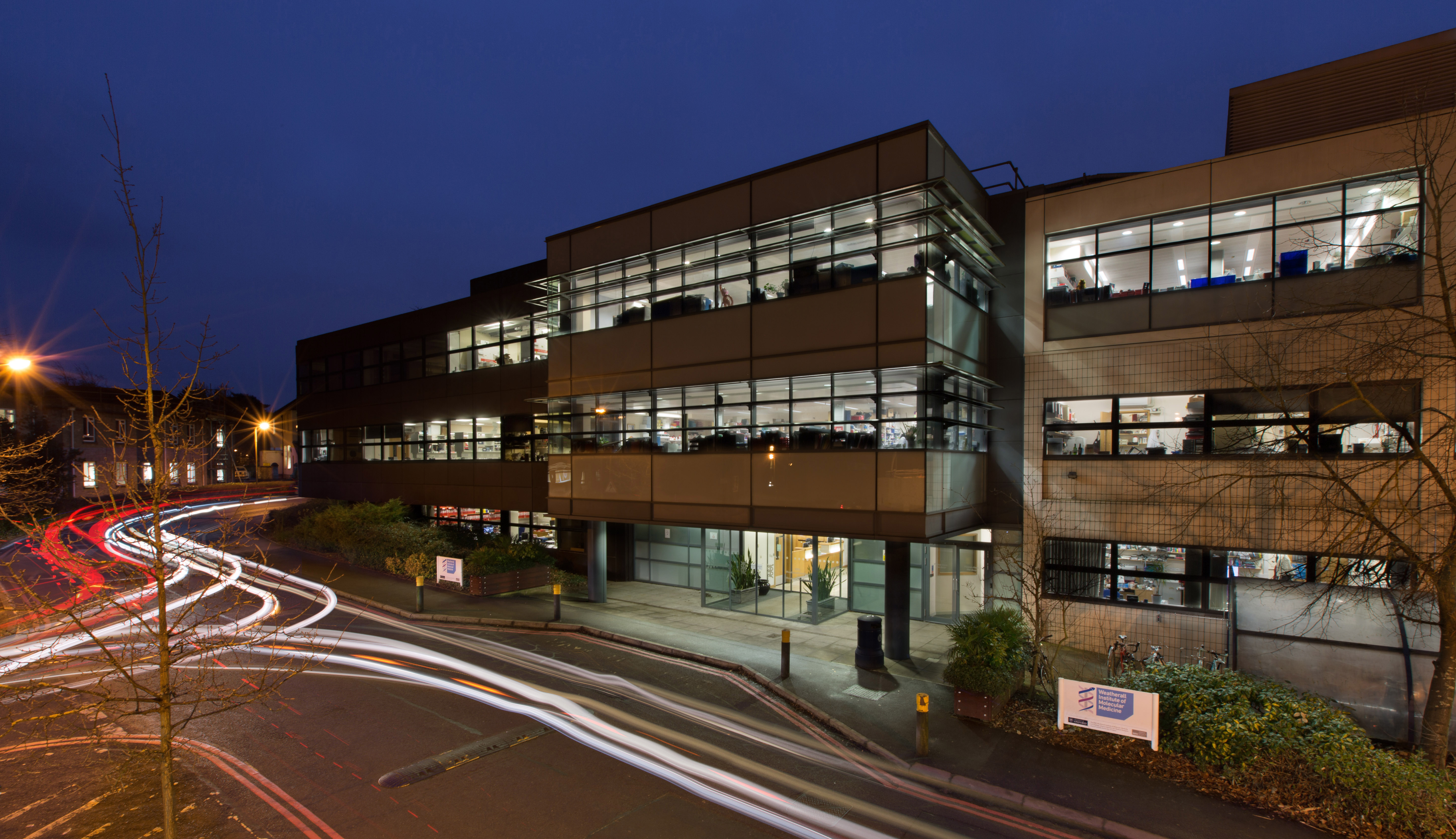
- MRC Weatherall Institute of Molecular Medicine
- Established: 1989
- Founder: Sir David Weatherall
- Type: Research institute
- Purpose: Medical research
- Location: John Radcliffe Hospital, Headley Way Oxford OX3 9DS, United Kingdom
- Coordinates: 51.76356826202882°N 1.217165636691765°W,
- Director: KJ Patel FRS
- Website: www.imm.ox.ac.uk

The MRC Weatherall Institute of Molecular Medicine is a research institute of the Radcliffe Department of Medicine at the Medical Sciences Division at the University of Oxford in Oxford, England, United Kingdom. It is located at the John Radcliffe Hospital.

Founded in 1989 by Sir David Weatherall, the institute focuses on furthering our understanding of clinical medicine at a molecular level. It was one of the first institutes of its kind in the world to be dedicated to research in this area.

The MRC WIMM is part of the Medical Sciences Division at the University of Oxford. It hosts over 500 staff and students from seven different departments working on five key areas of research: immunology and infection, haematology, rare diseases, cancer biology, stem cells and developmental biology. The institute houses the MRC Human Immunology Unit, MRC Molecular Haematology Unit and MRC WIMM Centre for Computational Biology. A third of the researchers are clinically qualified and have joint posts with the departments at the Oxford University Hospitals NHS Foundation Trust.

== Research ==
Several research breakthroughs have been made at the MRC WIMM.

- Researchers based at the WIMM discovered how cells and tissues recognise and respond to oxygen levels; work for which Sir Peter Ratcliffe was awarded the Nobel Prize in Medicine or Physiology in 2019.
- Researchers there made key discoveries on how the HIV virus evades the immune system.
- The institute has a long track record in genetics and researchers there uncovered many of the molecular mechanisms underlying genetic disorders affecting haemoglobin production including alpha thalassaemia. It contributed to the human genome project and identified key genes and processes in a variety of human genetic diseases.
- Scientists at the institute have defined novel mechanisms by which the immune system causes severe neurological diseases, which has led to new therapies.

== MRC Molecular Haematology Unit ==
Originally founded in 1980, the MRC Molecular Haematology Unit (MRC MHU) is now situated in the MRC Weatherall Institute of Molecular Medicine. 14 research teams work within the unit to understand a variety of haematological processes. Over 100 researchers are studying projects including work on stem cells and how they mature into blood components such as red cells, granulocytes, lymphocytes and platelets. Research is also carried out to understand what happens when these processes are disrupted in diseases of the blood including leukaemia, myelodysplasia and thalassaemia.

The unit's research is integrated with NHS patient services through collaboration with the clinical Department of Haematology at Oxford University NHS Foundation Trust. Many of the researchers are also practicing clinicians and links with the Department of Haematology and Paediatrics at Oxford University provide access to clinical samples and help discoveries made at the unit to be effectively translated into improvements in medicine in clinics for patients.

=== MRC MHU group leaders ===
- Ronjon Chakraverty: Haematopoietic Transplantation and Immunotherapy
- Ross Chapman: Recombination mechanisms in immunity and cancer
- James Davies: Genomics and Clinical Genome Editing
- Mariella de Bruijn: Developmental Haematopoiesis
- Jim Hughes: Genome Biology
- Adam Mead: Haematopoietic Stem Cell Biology
- Tom Milne: Epigenetics and Gene Regulation in Leukaemia
- Claus Nerlov: Haematopoietic Stem Cell Genetics
- KJ Patel: Two tier protection and metabolic genotoxicity during blood production
- Beth Psaila: The tumour microenvironment in blood cancers
- Andi Roy: Childhood leukaemia research group
- Paresh Vyas: Biology and Treatment of Human Myeloid Cancers
- Adam Wilkinson: Blood stem cell fitness mechanisms

== MRC Translational Immune Discovery Unit (formerly Human Immunology Unit) ==
Founded in 1998 as the MRC Human Immunology Unit (MRC HIU), the MRC Translational Immune Discovery Unit (MRC TIDU) focuses on researching the molecular pathogenesis of immune-mediated diseases. In 2023, The MRC HIU rebranded to be called the MRC TIDU. Research within the unit aims to increase our understanding of how the human immune system functions throughout life, particularly the response to infection and cancer. Their work contributes to the development of treatments for cancer, autoimmune diseases and infections. The unit works in collaboration with the NHS and industry, along with charities, including Wellcome and Cancer Research UK.

During the COVID-19 pandemic of the 2020s, the MRC HIU (now the MRC TIDU) researched several treatments for COVID-19 and SARS-CoV-2 infections, including therapeutics, and prophylactic vaccines. The HIU (now TIDU) and the Pirbright Institute studied the Oxford RBD-SpyVLP vaccine, a virus-like particle (VLP)-based vaccine targeting the spike glycoprotein receptor-binding domain (RBD).

=== MRC TIDU group leaders ===
- Oliver Bannard: B cell Immunology
- Richard Cornall: B cell development and immune regulation
- Simon Davis: T cell biology
- Tao Dong: T cell responses against viruses and cancer
- Hal Drakesmith: Iron and immunity
- Ling-Pei Ho: Translational lung immunology
- David Jackson: Lymphatic Trafficking
- Hashem Koohy: Machine Learning and integrative approaches in immunology
- Lars Fugger: Oxford Centre for Neuroinflammation
- Jan Rehwinkel: Nucleic Acid Sensing
- Alison Simmons: Intestinal Immunity in Health and Disease
- Graham Ogg: Skin Immunology group
- Alain Townsend: Molecular immunology

== Directors ==
- Sir David Weatherall FRS 1989-2000
- Sir Andrew McMichael FRS 2000-2012
- Prof Doug Higgs FRS 2012-2020
- Prof KJ Patel FRS 2020-

== Alumni ==
- Prof Charles Bangham (Chair of Immunology, Imperial College London)
- Sir John Bell FRS, (Regius Chair of Medicine, University of Oxford)
- Prof Roy Bicknell, (Professor of Functional Genomics, University of Birmingham)
- Prof Vincenzo Cerundolo (Previous Director of the MRC Human Immunology Unit, University of Oxford)
- Prof Paul Crocker FRSE, (Professor of Glycoimmunology, University of Dundee)
- Dame Kay Davies FRS, (Professor of Anatomy, University of Oxford)
- Sir Jeremy Farrar FRS, (Director of the Wellcome Trust)
- Prof Jonathan Frampton, (Professor of Stem Cell Biology, University of Birmingham)
- Prof Frances Gotch, (Emeritus Professor of Immunology, Imperial College London)
- Prof Ann Harris, (Professor of Paediatrics, Northwestern University)
- Prof Peter Harris, (Professor of Biochemistry and Molecular Biology, Mayo Clinic Rochester )
- Prof Chris Higgins, (Previous Vice Chancellor, Durham University)
- Prof Adrian Hill, (Director of the Jenner Institute, University of Oxford)
- Prof Anthony Monaco, (President of Tufts University)
- Prof Paul Moss, (Professor of Haematology, University of Birmingham)
- Sir Peter Ratcliffe FRS, (Nobel Prize winner, Professor of Clinical Medicine, University of Oxford)
- Prof Gavin Screaton, (Head of the Medical Sciences Division, University of Oxford)
- Prof Swee Lay Thein, (Chief of the Sickle Cell Branch of the National Heart, Lung, and Blood Institute, NIH)
