= Suranjith Dharmasena =

Sri Lankan cricketer

Personal information
- Born: 26 December 1965 (age 60); Colombo, Ceylon

Domestic team information
- Years: Team
- 1989–1993: Tamil Union

Career statistics
Competition	FC	LA
Matches	28	5
Runs scored	993	80
Batting average	31.03	16.00
100s/50s	1/9	0/0
Top score	105	43
Balls bowled	-	6
Wickets	-	0
Bowling average	-	-
5 wickets in innings	-	0
10 wickets in match	-	0
Best bowling	-	0/5
Catches/stumpings	16/-	1/0
- Source: CricketArchive (subscription required), 29 April 2020

Suranjith Dharmasena (born 26 December 1965) is a Sri Lankan cricketer who played for Tamil Union Cricket and Athletic Club. He played in twenty-eight first-class and five List A matches between 1989 and 1993.

== Early life ==
Dharmasena was born in Colombo in 1965. His mother, Sopahia (née Marasinghe) represented Ceylon in volleyball and netball. Suranjith and his brother Kishan both attended Thurstan College, where Suranjith was cricket captain in 1984.

== Playing career ==
Dharmasena played in Sri Lankan domestic cricket for Tamil Union Cricket and Athletic Club, making his first-class cricket debut in 1989. His Sri Lankan cricket career was cut short when, in 1993, he moved to the United Arab Emirates (UAE) to work as a banker. His career continued in the UAE, where he was a prolific batsman in club cricket.

In February 2020, he was named in Sri Lanka's squad for the Over-50s Cricket World Cup in South Africa. However, the tournament was cancelled during the third round of matches due to the COVID-19 pandemic. He and another Sri Lankan former cricketer Mahesh De Zoysa were left stranded in Cape Town, South Africa due to the lockdown in the country and lack of flight availability.
