= Office for Strategic Coordination of Health Research =

Health department in the United Kingdom

The Office for Strategic Coordination of Health Research (OSCHR) is a forum operating across the four parts of the National Health Service in the United Kingdom body designed "to facilitate more efficient translation of health research into health and economic benefits in the UK through better coordination of health research and more coherent funding arrangements to support translation."

As of September 2020, the body has 15 members, including Chief Medical Officer Chris Whitty, the Scottish Chief Scientist for Health David Crossman, Jennifer Rubin of the Economic and Social Research Council, and Fiona Watt of Medical Research Council.

== History ==
The OSCHR was created following a review of UK health research funding by David Cooksey, published in 2006. Cooksey noted the significant strength of the British scientific base. However, he also identified cultural, institutional and financial difficulties that hinder the effective implementation of health research into clinical practice.
