= David Weatherall =

British biomedical researcher (1933–2018)

Professor Sir David Weatherall GBE FRS
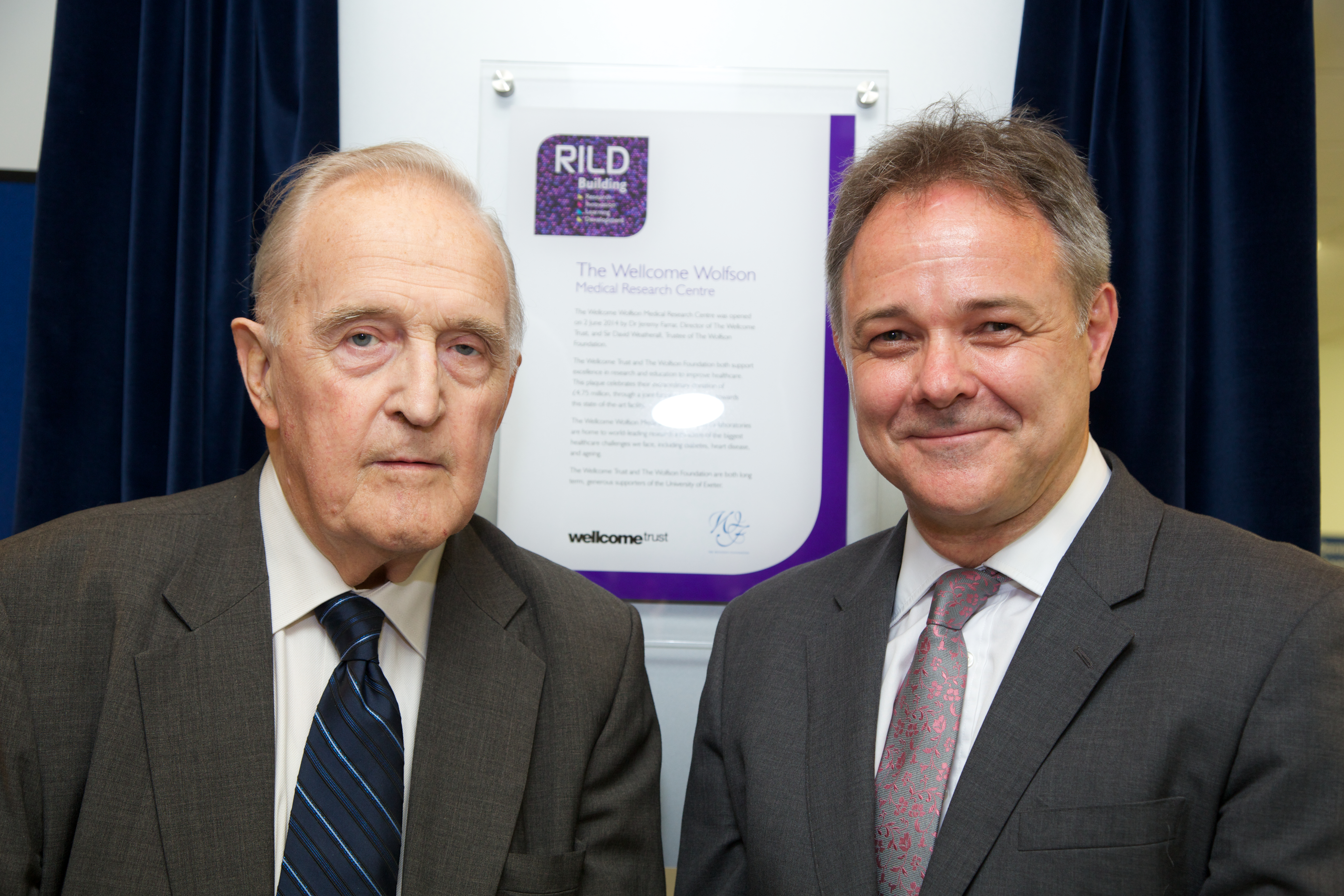
- Weatherall (left) and Jeremy Farrar (right) in 2014
- Born: David John Weatherall; 9 March 1933; Liverpool, England, United Kingdom
- Died: 8 December 2018 (aged 85); Oxford, England, United Kingdom
- Education: University of Liverpool
- Known for: Work on the thalassaemias
- Awards: GBE (2017); Knight Bachelor (1987); Manson Medal (1988); William Allan Award (2003); Mendel Medal (2006); Lasker Award (2010)
- Scientific career
- Workplaces: University of Oxford; Johns Hopkins University; Keele University

Sir David John Weatherall (9 March 1933 – 8 December 2018) was a British physician and researcher in molecular genetics, haematology, pathology and clinical medicine.

== Early life and education ==
David Weatherall was born in Liverpool. He was educated at Calday Grange Grammar School and then attended Medical School at the University of Liverpool where he served as Treasurer of the Liverpool Medical Students Society in 1954.

He graduated from medical school in 1956. After house staff training, he joined the Army for 2 years, as part of the national service and was stationed in Singapore. There he treated the daughter of a Gurkha soldier with thalassemia, which sparked a lifelong interest in this disease. He used car batteries and filter paper for electrophoresis while there.

== Career ==
Returning from military service, he took a fellowship at Johns Hopkins University. He returned to Liverpool, where he rose to the rank of Professor of Haematology. His research concentrated on the genetics of the haemoglobinopathies and, in particular, a group of inherited haematological disorders known as the thalassemias that are associated with abnormalities in the production of globin, the protein component of haemoglobin. Weatherall was one of the world's experts on the clinical and molecular basis of the thalassemias and the application for their control and prevention in developing countries.

In 1974, Weatherall moved to Oxford, as he was appointed Nuffield Professor of Clinical Medicine at the University of Oxford. He worked with the biochemist John Clegg until his retirement in 2000. They were able to separate the α and β chains of haemoglobin and to demonstrate that the relative lack of production of these proteins resulted in α and β thalassaemia.

In 1989, Weatherall founded the Institute of Molecular Medicine at Oxford, which was renamed the Weatherall Institute of Molecular Medicine in his honour in 2000 upon his retirement. From 1991 to 1996 he was a member of the Nuffield Council on Bioethics. In 1992, he assumed the most prestigious chair, that of Regius Professor of Medicine, which he held until retirement.

He was a member of the National Committee of Inquiry into Higher Education that published an influential report in 1997.

In 2002, Weatherall wrote a major report on the application of genomics for global health for the World Health Organization. During this year, he also became Chancellor of Keele University.. Weatherall was a Distinguished Supporter of Humanists UK.

In 2009, a working group report under Weatherall's Chairmanship concluded that there was a strong scientific case to maintain biomedical research activities using non-human primates in carefully selected areas.

== Awards and honours ==
Weatherall was knighted in 1987 and appointed Knight Grand Cross of the Order of the British Empire (GBE) in the 2017 Birthday Honours for services to medicine.

In 1989 he was awarded the Royal Medal by the Royal Society for his work on the thalassaemias.

In 1995 he was awarded the Fothergillian prize by the London Medical Society.

In 1998 he was awarded the Manson Medal by the Royal Society of Tropical Medicine and Hygiene for his contributions to the field of tropical medicine and hygiene. He was an inaugural Fellow of the Academy of Medical Sciences (1998).

In 2005 he was elected to the American Philosophical Society.

In 2010 he was awarded a Lasker Award, the most significant US prize for medical research with many past award winners subsequently going on to receive Nobel prizes. He was the only person outside America to win the award that year.

In 2012, Keele University named the Medical School building on the Keele Campus the David Weatherall Building in honour of Sir David. The MRC Weatherall Institute of Molecular Medicine (WIMM) is named in his honour.

He was an honorary member of the British Society for Immunology.

Academic offices
Preceded by Baron Moser	Chancellor of Keele University; 2002—2012	Succeeded by Jonathon Porritt
