= Confidential Enquiry into Maternal Deaths in the UK =

Confidential Enquiry into Maternal Deaths (CEMD)
- Logo for MBRRACE-UK, the collaboration conducting the CEMD since 2012
- Abbreviation: CEMD
- Formation: 1952; 74 years ago
- Type: Confidential Enquiry
- Legal status: Operational
- Location: NPEU, Old Road Campus, University of Oxford
- Region served: UK and Ireland
- Programme Lead: Jenny Kurinczuk
- Maternal Programme Lead: Marian Knight
- Budget: £352,700 per year
- Staff: 10
- Website: www.npeu.ox.ac.uk/mbrrace-uk

The Confidential Enquiry into Maternal Deaths (CEMD) is a national programme investigating maternal deaths in the UK and Ireland. Since June 2012, the CEMD has been carried out by the MBRRACE-UK (Mothers and Babies: Reducing Risk through Audits and Confidential Enquiries) collaboration, commissioned by the Healthcare Quality Improvement Partnership (HQIP).

The predecessor to MBRRACE-UK, CMACE (Centre for Maternal and Child Enquiries) produced a report every triennium, analysing all maternal deaths from the previous three years divided into topic-specific chapters. Reports are now published on an annual basis, with each report focusing on a selection of chapters. Furthermore, each MBRRACE-UK report now contains the Confidential Enquiry into Maternal Morbidity (CEMM), a study focusing on women who survived severe pregnancy problems, with the topic chosen in an open application process. The 2014 CEMM topic was maternal sepsis.

The most recent report by the CEMD (and the first by MBRRACE-UK) was published in December 2014, and focused on deaths from AFE, sepsis, haemorrhage, deaths from neurological complications, and deaths from other medical and surgical complications between 2009 and 2012. During the time that the Confidential Enquiry into Maternal Deaths has existed, there has been a fall in overall maternal deaths in the UK, with rates having fallen from 90 per 100,000 women giving birth in 1952 to around 10 per 100,000 at present.

== Maternal deaths ==
According to the United Nations Maternal Mortality Estimation Inter-agency Group, which consists of representatives from the World Health Organization (WHO), United Nations Children's Fund (UNICEF), the United Nations Population Fund (UNFPA), United Nations Population Division, the World Bank and world-renowned academics, maternal death is:

"The death of a woman while pregnant or within 42 days of termination of pregnancy, irrespective of the duration and the site of the pregnancy, from any cause related to or aggravated by the pregnancy or its management, but not from accidental or incidental causes".

In addition, a late maternal death is one which occurs more than six weeks but less than one year after the end of pregnancy. Maternal deaths can be further divided by cause, typically into: direct deaths, resulting from obstetric complications of the pregnant state (e.g. amniotic fluid embolism, pre-eclampsia); indirect deaths, resulting from medical or medical health conditions exacerbated by pregnancy (e.g. cardiac disease) or coincidental deaths, where the cause is unrelated to pregnancy (e.g. RTA, homicide).

The CEMD reports on all maternal deaths in the UK and Ireland, including those that are late and/or coincidental.

== History of the CEMD ==
The current system of confidential enquiries began in 1952, however, the history of smaller, local enquiries dates back to 1917 in Aberdeen, with national enquiries across England, Scotland and Wales following in the 1920s and 1930s. Maternal deaths during this period were particularly prevalent in poor, working-class families, thus a large part of these early local enquiries was focused on the social backgrounds of the women who died. Further emphasis was placed on educating women and their families on the importance of maternity care as well as an understanding of the warning signs of complications and the importance of seeking help.

Due to the large number of births taking place in non-clinical settings, avoidable clinical factors were not the only consideration. There was an emphasis on the need for health care workers to improve hygiene standards and ensure training in the use of forceps, and to ensure deliveries requiring other forms of intervention were undertaken in hospital. These local enquiries, along with various medical advances (notably the introduction of antibiotics) were credited with a sharp decline in maternal deaths in the 1930s and 1940s.

In 1952 the Ministry of Health instituted the national confidential enquiry for both England and Wales, initially to reports its findings on a three-yearly basis, and since 2014 on a yearly basis. Since its inception, the overall aims of the enquiry have been:

- To save more women's and newborns' lives, to reduce complications, and to improve the quality of maternity services for the benefit of all pregnant women, their infants, and their families.
- Through the use of guidelines and recommendations, to help ensure that all pregnant and recently delivered women receive the best possible care, delivered in appropriate settings in a way that takes account of, and meets, their individual needs.

In Northern Ireland, a similar report to the CEMD was published from 1956 to 1984, initially covering four years of maternal deaths at a time. However, due to falling maternal death rates in the country, the final reports covered a larger period of time. The final report covering years 1978-84 covered just 32 deaths. Currently, the agency NIMACH (Northern Ireland Maternal and Child Health) is responsible for collecting and analysing data in support of MBRRACE-UK.

Scotland also conducted a series of confidential enquiries, with the first dealing with maternal deaths from 1965 to 1971.

For maternal deaths from 1985 onwards, a single report has been published for the whole of the United Kingdom. Since 2009, maternal deaths from the Republic of Ireland have also been included in the CEMD, with the agency MDE Ireland responsible for all data collection for maternal deaths from the Republic of Ireland.

Since the first CEMD report was published in 1952, maternal deaths have fallen from 90 per 100,000 women giving birth in 1952 to around 10 per 100,000 at present. It is regarded as the 'gold standard' for Confidential Enquiries worldwide.

== Confidential enquiry process ==
A confidential enquiry is an enquiry designed to improve health and health care by collecting data, identifying any shortfalls in the care provided and devising recommendations to improve future care. They are confidential in the sense that the details of the patient/hospital/involved clinicians remain anonymous to those conducting the enquiry.

The CEMD collects and processes anonymous data of every maternal death in the UK and Ireland before they are looked at by several of the MBRRACE-UK expert assessors. MBRRACE-UK has approximately 100 assessors from different specialty groups including obstetrics, anaesthesia, intensive care, midwifery, pathology, psychiatry, general practice, emergency medicine, obstetric medicine, neurology, infectious diseases and cardiology. Each maternal death case is typically looked at by between ten and fifteen expert reviewers. All of the assessors for the CEMD are volunteers who are not remunerated for their work.

Once all data has been collected and each case has undergone review, multi-disciplinary chapter writing groups are convened, where the expert reviews of each case are examined to enable key learning themes to be drawn out for the final report. The lead member of each chapter writing group will then draft the initial chapter, which is then reviewed by the other group members and the Programme Lead before a final version is completed. Where possible, any recommendations by the CEMD are linked to national guidance from organisations such as NICE or SIGN.

== Key findings ==
The latest CEMD was published in 2014 and focused on surveillance of all maternal deaths from the period 2009-12 and confidential enquiries where the cause of death was from haemorrhage, amniotic fluid embolism, anaesthetic-related causes, neurological and other indirect causes. A further sample of survivors of septic shock were also subject to Confidential Enquiry.

Between 2009 and 2012, 357 women died in the UK and Ireland during pregnancy or within six weeks of the end of their pregnancy. 106 of these were considered to be direct maternal deaths, representing a statistically significant decrease. The number of deaths from indirect causes increased however, with 215 women dying over the four-year period. The remaining 36 deaths were classified as coincidental. It was commented in news articles, as well as in the report itself that a significant number of late maternal deaths were attributable to psychiatric causes.

Despite the overall fall, the researchers claimed there are 'key areas that the health service can look to improve in order to reduce the number of maternal deaths from these indirect causes'.

The report urged clinicians to 'Think Sepsis' after almost a quarter of maternal deaths were from sepsis. More specifically, the advice was for staff to take all appropriate observations and act on them when presented with an unwell pregnant (or recently pregnant) woman. Furthermore, rapid administration of intravenous antibiotics and escalating the care of the woman to senior doctors and midwives quickly were considered essential.

Another key recommendation of the report was to encourage clinicians to promote the flu vaccine to all pregnant women, with flu one of the leading causes of preventable death in pregnancy (1 in 11 of the women who died). It was reported that less than half of pregnant women eligible for a free flu vaccine had taken it up. The MBRRACE-UK report notes that of the maternal deaths caused by Flu, more than half could have been prevented had the woman received a flu jab.

In addition to the full report, MBRRACE-UK publishes an executive summary listing separate key areas for action for policy-makers, medical directors, doctors and midwives.

The executive summary, lay report and full MBRRACE-UK report is published online and available publicly.

== See also ==
- National Perinatal Epidemiology Unit
- Maternal death
- HQIP
