= S-index =

s-index may refer to:

- S-index, a spectroscopic measure of chromospheric activity on other stars
- s-index, an author-level metric
