= Geoffrey Chamberlain =

Obstetrician and gynaecologist (1930–2014)

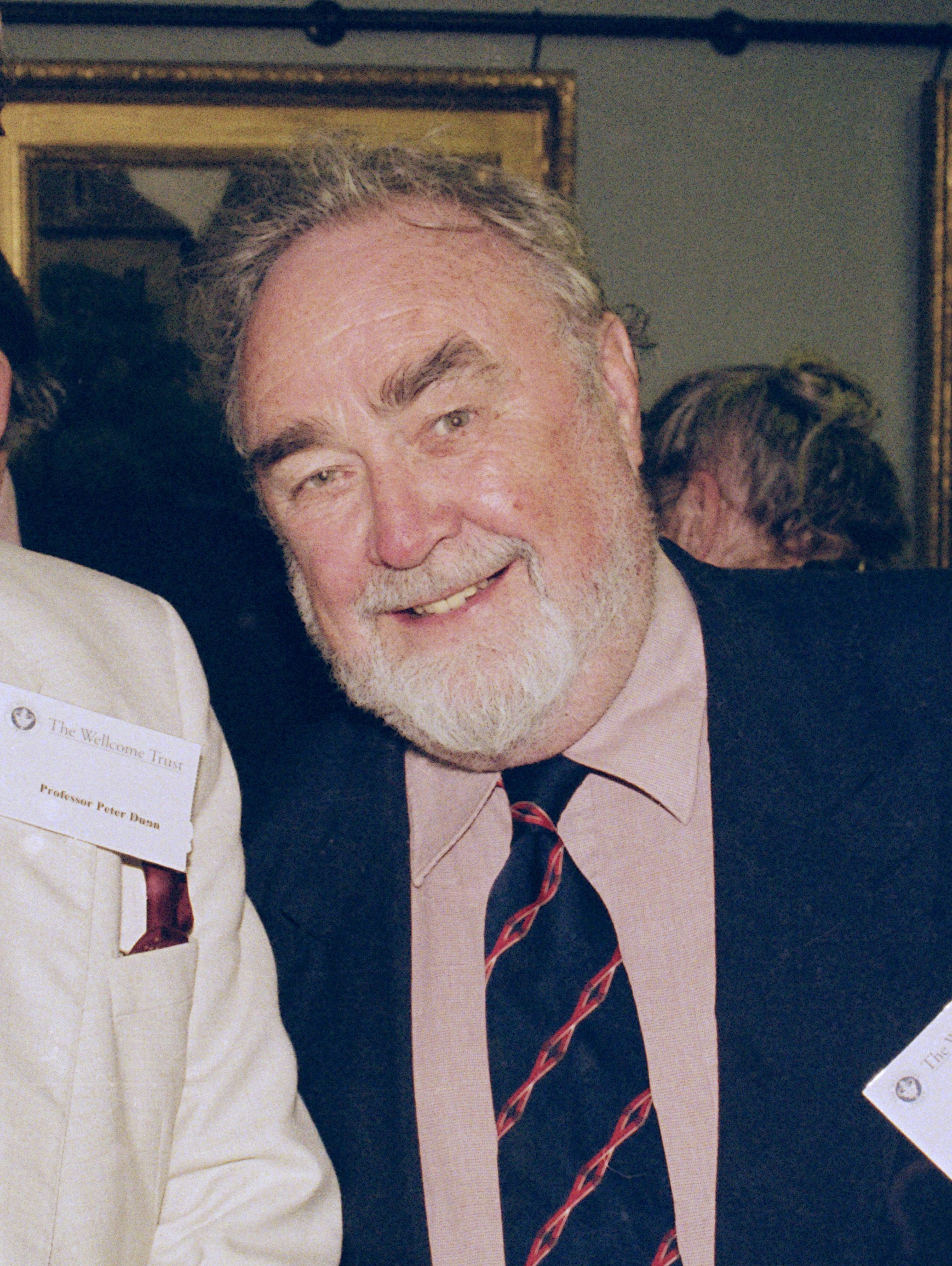
- Chamberlain in 2000
- Born: Geoffrey Victor Price Chamberlain; 21 April 1930; Cardiff, Wales
- Died: 30 October 2014 (aged 84)
- Education: Cowbridge Grammar School, University College London
- Known for: President of the Royal College of Obstetricians and Gynaecologists, 1993–1994
- Medical career
- Profession: Gynaecologist and Obstetrician
- Institutions: St George's Hospital, Tooting
- Notable works: Obstetrics by Ten Teachers; Home Births: The Report of the 1994 Confidential Enquiry by the National Birthday Trust Fund

Geoffrey Victor Price Chamberlain (21 April 1930 – 30 October 2014) was a professor and the academic head at the department of obstetrics and gynaecology at St George's Hospital, London, editor-in-chief of the British Journal of Obstetrics and Gynaecology and president of the Royal College of Obstetricians and Gynaecologists (RCOG). At one time, he was president of the obstetrics and gynaecology section at the Royal Society of Medicine. He also authored numerous textbooks and journal articles on obstetrics.

Chamberlain took considerable interest in maternal mortality and frequently presented significant importance to the triennal Confidential Enquiries into Maternal Death Reports. In his role with the National Birthday Trust, he directed four national surveys of British obstetrics.

He resigned from his academic, editorial and presidential posts following his acceptance of a 'gift authorship' on a fraudulent research paper written by a colleague. Subsequently, Chamberlain moved to Wales where he published an internationally acclaimed textbook, From Witchcraft to Wisdom, whilst teaching history of medicine as an Apothecaries' lecturer.

== Early life ==
Geoffrey Chamberlain was born on 21 April 1930 in Cardiff to Albert Victor Chamberlain, the Lord Mayor of Cardiff's secretary, and Irene May Chamberlain née Price.

His early education was at Llandaff Cathedral School, followed by Cowbridge Grammar School, before he went on to University College London to study medicine. His flair at rugby at school earned him the nickname "Bodger".

== Medical career ==
Chamberlain's early appointments included placements at the Royal Postgraduate Medical School, Great Ormond Street Hospital for Children, Queen Charlotte's and Chelsea Hospital for Women, and King's College Hospital, London. Subsequently, between 1965 and 1966, he taught at the George Washington Hospital, Washington DC, USA. It was during these years that he performed his controversial fetal and placental research.

In 1954, he entered the Royal Naval Volunteer Reserve, before retiring in 1974 with the rank of surgeon commander.

He held a consultant post at Queen Charlotte's and Chelsea Hospital for 12 years from 1970. In 1982 he was appointed professor of obstetrics and gynaecology at St George's Hospital Medical School, where he remained until his resignation in 1995.

In 1989, Chamberlain was elected president of the section of obstetrics and gynaecology at the Royal Society of Medicine. Between 1971 and 1994, he was actively involved in several areas of the RCOG, being elected vice-president from 1984 to 1987 and president from 1993 to 1994 and being a member of the council throughout that whole time. He was also the academic head of the department and editor-in-chief of the British Journal of Obstetrics and Gynaecology. In 1994, Chamberlain carried out the 1994 Home Birth Study, which demonstrated the safety of planned home births.

Chamberlain took considerable interest in maternal mortality, often recommending GP Irvine Loudon's book, Death in Childbirth, which he described as "first rate", authoring articles on the subject and presenting significant importance to the triennal Confidential Enquiries into Maternal Death Reports. In addition, he directed four national surveys of British obstetrics in his role with the National Birthday Trust.

In 1994, Chamberlain resigned as editor-in-chief of the British Journal of Obstetrics and Gynaecology and as president of the Royal College of Obstetricians and Gynaecologists after unknowingly counter-signing a dishonest report on a fabricated story about a successful transplant of an ectopic fetus into the uterine cavity. The concept of 'gift authorship' was not uncommon at the time, where, without contributing, a senior name could appear on a paper. It could have happened in many other journals.

Over the years, Chamberlain had witnessed an increase in attendance of the partner during labour and once said that "the presence of the husband in the labour room has been an advance", they "can act as a referee between midwife, doctor and the woman".

Between 2000 and 2008, he remained at Swansea University as an Apothecaries' lecturer in history of medicine. During this time, he produced an internationally successful textbook on the history of obstetrics, From Witchcraft to Wisdom.

== Personal and family ==
Chamberlain appreciated opera and travel. He carved wooden decoy ducks and enjoyed wearing his Dr. Martens.

He married Jocelyn Olivia Kerley in 1956; they had five children together.

== Death and legacy ==
Chamberlain died on 30 October 2014 at the age of 84.

The Royal College of Obstetricians and Gynaecologists presents the Professor Geoffrey Chamberlain award every three years to outstanding trainees.

== Selected publications ==
- Geoffrey Chamberlain (1975). British births 1970: a survey under the joint auspices of the National Birthday Trust Fund and the Royal College of Obstetricians and Gynaecologists, Volume 1: The First Week of Life. London: Heinemann Medical. ISBN 978-0-433-05470-2.
- Geoffrey Chamberlain; Ann Wraight; Philip J. Steer (1993). Pain and its relief in childbirth: the results of a national survey conducted by the National Birthday Trust. Churchill Livingstone. ISBN 978-0-443-04658-2.
- Geoffrey Chamberlain; Sara Purdy (1995). Obstetrics by Ten Teachers 16E. Taylor & Francis. ISBN 978-0-340-57313-6.
- Geoffrey Chamberlain; A. Wraight; P. Crowley, eds. (1997). Home Births: The Report of the 1994 Confidential Enquiry by the National Birthday Trust Fund'. The Parthenon Publishing Group. ISBN 978-1-85070-934-3.
- Geoffrey Chamberlain; Margery Morgan (2002). ABC of Antenatal Care. Wiley. ISBN 978-0-7279-1692-1.
- Chamberlain, Geoffrey (2006). "British Maternal Mortality in the 19th and Early 20th Centuries". Journal of the Royal Society of Medicine. 99 (11): 559–563. doi:10.1177/014107680609901113. PMC 1633559. PMID 17082299.
- Geoffrey Chamberlain (2007). From Witchcraft to Wisdom: A History of Obstetrics and Gynaecology in the British Isles. London: Royal College of Obstetricians and Gynaecologists. ISBN 978-1-904752-14-1.
