= H-index =

Measure of a scholar's citation impact

The h-index is an author-level metric that measures both the productivity and citation impact of the publications, initially used for an individual scientist or scholar. The h-index correlates with success indicators such as winning the Nobel Prize, being accepted for research fellowships and holding positions at top universities. The index is based on the set of the scientist's most cited papers and the number of citations that they have received in other publications. The index has more recently been applied to the productivity and impact of a scholarly journal as well as a group of scientists, such as a department or university or country.

The index was suggested in 2005 by Jorge E. Hirsch, a physicist at UC San Diego, as a tool for determining theoretical physicists' relative quality and is sometimes called the Hirsch index or Hirsch number.

Hirsch intended the h-index to address the main disadvantages of other bibliometric indicators. The total-number-of-papers metric does not account for the quality of scientific publications. The total number of citations metric, on the other hand, can be heavily affected by participation in a single publication of major influence (for instance, methodological papers proposing successful new techniques, methods or approximations, which can generate a large number of citations).

The index works best when comparing scholars working in the same field, since citation conventions differ widely among different fields.

The h-index is intended to measure simultaneously the quality and quantity of scientific output. The Kendall's correlation of h-index with scientific awards in physics was found at 34 percent in 2010 and zero percent in 2019.

== Calculation ==
The h-index is defined as the maximum value of h such that the given author/journal has published at least h papers that have each been cited at least h times.

h-index from a plot of numbers of citations for an author's numbered papers (arranged in decreasing order)

The h-index is the largest h such that h articles have at least h citations each. For example, if an author has five publications, with 9, 7, 6, 2, and 1 citations (ordered from greatest to least), then the author's h-index is 3, because the author has three publications with 3 or more citations. However, the author does not have four publications with 4 or more citations.

Accordingly, an author's h-index can only be as great as their number of publications. For example, an author with only one publication can have a maximum h-index of 1 (if their publication has 1 or more citations). On the other hand, an author with many publications, each with only 1 citation, would also have an h-index of 1.

Formally, if f is the function that corresponds to the number of citations for each publication, we compute the h-index as follows: First we order the values of f from the largest to the lowest value. Then, we look for the last position in which f is greater than or equal to the position (we call h this position). For example, if we have a researcher with 5 publications A, B, C, D, and E with 10, 8, 5, 4, and 3 citations, respectively, the h-index is equal to 4 because the 4th publication has 4 citations and the 5th has only 3. In contrast, if the same publications have 25, 8, 5, 3, and 3 citations, then the index is 3 (i.e. the 3rd position) because the fourth paper has only 3 citations.

f(A)=10, f(B)=8, f(C)=5, f(D)=4, f(E)=3 → h-index=4
f(A)=25, f(B)=8, f(C)=5, f(D)=3, f(E)=3 → h-index=3

If we have the function f ordered in decreasing order from the largest value to the lowest one, we can compute the h-index as follows:

h-index (f) = $\max\{i\in\N: f(i)\ge i\}$

The Hirsch index is analogous to the Eddington number, an earlier metric used for evaluating cyclists. h-index is also related to Sugeno integral and Ky Fan metric. The h-index serves as an alternative to more traditional journal impact factor metrics in the evaluation of the impact of the work of a particular researcher. Because only the most highly cited articles contribute to the h-index, its determination is a simpler process. Hirsch has demonstrated that h has high predictive value for whether a scientist has won honors like National Academy membership or the Nobel Prize. The h-index grows as citations accumulate and thus it depends on the "academic age" of a researcher.

== Input data ==
The h-index can be manually determined by using citation databases or using automatic tools. Subscription-based databases such as Scopus and the Web of Science provide automated calculators. From July 2011 Google has provided an automatically calculated h-index and i10-index within its own Google Scholar profile. In addition, specific databases, such as the INSPIRE-HEP database can automatically calculate the h-index for researchers working in high energy physics.

Each database is likely to produce a different h for the same scholar, because of different coverage. A detailed study showed that the Web of Science has strong coverage of journal publications, but poor coverage of high impact conferences. Scopus has better coverage of conferences, but poor coverage of publications prior to 1996; Google Scholar has the best coverage of conferences and most journals (though not all), but like Scopus has limited coverage of pre-1990 publications. The exclusion of conference proceedings papers is a particular problem for scholars in computer science, where conference proceedings are considered an important part of the literature. Google Scholar has been criticized for producing "phantom citations", including gray literature in its citation counts, and failing to follow the rules of Boolean logic when combining search terms. For example, the Meho and Yang study found that Google Scholar identified 53% more citations than Web of Science and Scopus combined, but noted that because most of the additional citations reported by Google Scholar were from low-impact journals or conference proceedings, they did not significantly alter the relative ranking of the individuals. It has been suggested that in order to deal with the sometimes wide variation in h for a single academic measured across the possible citation databases, one should assume false negatives in the databases are more problematic than false positives and take the maximum h measured for an academic.

== Examples ==
Little systematic investigation has been done on how the h-index behaves over different institutions, nations, times and academic fields. Hirsch suggested that, for physicists, a value for h of about 12 might be typical for advancement to tenure (associate professor) at major [US] research universities. A value of about 18 could mean a full professorship, 15–20 could mean a fellowship in the American Physical Society, and 45 or higher could mean membership in the United States National Academy of Sciences. Hirsch estimated that after 20 years a "successful scientist" would have an h-index of 20, an "outstanding scientist" would have an h-index of 40, and a "truly unique" individual would have an h-index of 60.

For the most highly cited scientists in the period 1983–2002, Hirsch identified the top 10 in the life sciences (in order of decreasing h): Solomon H. Snyder, h = 191; David Baltimore, h = 160; Robert C. Gallo, h = 154; Pierre Chambon, h = 153; Bert Vogelstein, h = 151; Salvador Moncada, h = 143; Charles A. Dinarello, h = 138; Tadamitsu Kishimoto, h = 134; Ronald M. Evans, h = 127; and Ralph L. Brinster, h = 126. Among 36 new inductees in the National Academy of Sciences in biological and biomedical sciences in 2005, the median h-index was 57. However, Hirsch noted that values of h will vary among disparate fields.

Among the 22 scientific disciplines listed in the Essential Science Indicators citation thresholds (thus excluding non-science academics), physics has the second most citations after space science. During the period between January 1, 2000 and February 28, 2010, a physicist had to receive 2073 citations to be among the most cited 1% of physicists in the world. The threshold for space science is the highest (2236 citations), and physics is followed by clinical medicine (1390) and molecular biology & genetics (1229). Most disciplines, such as environment/ecology (390), have fewer scientists, fewer papers, and fewer citations. Therefore, these disciplines have lower citation thresholds in the Essential Science Indicators, with the lowest citation thresholds observed in social sciences (154), computer science (149), and multidisciplinary sciences (147).

Numbers are very different in social science disciplines: The Impact of the Social Sciences team at London School of Economics found that social scientists in the United Kingdom had lower average h-indices. The h-indices for ("full") professors, based on Google Scholar data ranged from 2.8 (in law), through 3.4 (in political science), 3.7 (in sociology), 6.5 (in geography) and 7.6 (in economics). On average across the disciplines, a professor in the social sciences had an h-index about twice that of a lecturer or a senior lecturer, though the difference was the smallest in geography.

== Criticism ==
There are a number of situations in which h may provide misleading information about a scientist's output. The correlation between h-index and scientific awards dropped significantly since 2010 after the widespread usage of h-index, following Goodhart's law. The decrease of correlation is partially attributed to the spread of hyperauthorship with more than 100 coauthors per paper.

Some of the following failures are not exclusive to the h-index but rather shared with other author-level metrics:

- The h-index does not account for the number of authors of a paper. In the original paper, Hirsch suggested partitioning citations among co-authors. One such fractional index is known as fractional h-index, which accounts for multiple authors but is not widely available through the use of automatic tools.
- The h-index does not account for the different typical number of citations in different fields, e.g. experimental over theoretical. Citation behavior in general is affected by field-dependent factors, which may invalidate comparisons not only across disciplines but even within different fields of research of one discipline.
- The h-index discards the information contained in author placement in the authors' list, which in some scientific fields is significant though in others it is not.
- The h-index is an integer, which reduces its discriminatory power. Ruane and Tol therefore propose a rational h-index that interpolates between h and h + 1.

The h-index has been found in one study to have slightly less predictive accuracy and precision than the simpler measure of mean citations per paper. However, this finding was contradicted by another study by Hirsch. The h-index does not provide a significantly more accurate measure of impact than the total number of citations for a given scholar. In particular, by modeling the distribution of citations among papers as a random integer partition and the h-index as the Durfee square of the partition, Yong arrived at the formula $h\approx 0.54\sqrt N$, where N is the total number of citations, which, for mathematics members of the National Academy of Sciences, turns out to provide an accurate (with errors typically within 10–20 percent) approximation of h-index in most cases.

=== Susceptibility to manipulation ===
Weaknesses apply to the purely quantitative calculation of scientific or academic output. Like other metrics that count citations, the h-index can be manipulated by coercive citation, a practice in which an editor of a journal or a reviewer forces authors to add spurious citations to their own articles before the journal will agree to publish it. The h-index can be manipulated through self-citations, and if based on Google Scholar output, then even computer-generated documents can be used for that purpose, e.g. using SCIgen. The h-index can be also manipulated by hyperauthorship. Recent research shows clearly that the correlation of the h-index with awards that indicate recognition by the scientific community has substantially declined.

== Variants ==
Various proposals to modify the h-index in order to emphasize different features have been made. Many of these variants, such as g-index, are highly correlated with the original h-index, which has led some researchers to consider them redundant.

One metric which was found not to be highly correlated with h-index and is correlated with scientific awards as of 2019 is the fractional h-index.

A Hirsch-type index for institutions has also been devised. A scientific institution has a successive Hirsch-type index of i when at least i researchers from that institution have an h-index of at least i.

The h-index has been applied to internet media, such as YouTube channels. It is defined as the number of videos h a channel has with more than h × 10^{5} views. When compared with a video creator's total view count, the h-index and g-index better capture both productivity and impact in a single metric.

More recently, a dual framework distinguishing between disruptive and consolidating scientific impact has led to the development of new h-index variants.

Since 2015 a team of researchers led by John P. A. Ioannidis at Stanford maintains the Science-wide author databases of standardized citation indicators, a multidimensional ranking of the world's most cited scientists. This measure is composed of five ingredients: the h-index itself; the total number of citations; the coauthorship-adjusted Schreiber hm-index; the number of citations to papers as a single author; the number of citations to papers as a single or first author; and the number of citations to papers as a single, first, or last author.

== See also ==
- Bibliometrics
- Comparison of research networking tools and research profiling systems
- Science-wide author databases of standardized citation indicators
