= List of works by Ainslie Meares =

Ainslie Dixon Meares (1910–1986) was a prolific author, mainly on psychiatry, hypnotism, the treatment of cancer, and meditation. The following lists his different works in lexicographical order:

== Journal articles ==
- Meares, A., "A Dynamic Technique For The Induction Of Hypnosis", Medical Journal of Australia, Vol.I, No.18, (30 April 1955), pp. 644–646.
- Meares, A., "A Form of Intensive Meditation Associated with the Regression of Cancer", The American Journal of Clinical Hypnosis, Vol.25, Nos.2/3, (October 1982/January 1983), pp. 114–121.
- Meares, A., "A Note On Hypnosis and the Mono-Symptomatic Psychoneurotic", British Journal of Medical Hypnotism, Vol.8, No.2, (Winter 1956/7), pp. 2–4.
- Meares, A., "A Note on the Motivation for Hypnosis", Journal of Clinical and Experimental Hypnosis, Vol.III, No.4, (October 1955), pp. 222–228.
- Meares, A., "A Working Hypothesis as to the Nature of Hypnosis", Archives of Neurology and Psychiatry, Vol.77, (May 1957), pp. 549–555.
- Meares, A., "An Atavistic Theory of Hypnosis", pp. 73–103 in Kline, M.V. (ed.), The Nature of Hypnosis: Contemporary Theoretical Approaches, Transactions of the 1961 International Congress on Hypnosis, The Postgraduate Center for Psychotherapy and The Institute for Research in Hypnosis, (New York), 1962.
- Meares, A., "Anxiety and Hypnosis", Medical Journal of Australia, Vol.1, (1966), No.10, (5 March 1966), pp. 395–397.
- Meares, A., "Anxiety Reactions In Hypnosis", British Medical Journal, Vol.I, (1955), (18 June 1955), p. 1454.
- Meares, A., "Atavistic Regression As A Factor In The Remission Of Cancer", Medical Journal of Australia, Vol.2 (1977), No.4, (23 July 1977), pp. 132–133.
- Meares, A., "Cancer, Psychosomatic Illness, and Hysteria", Lancet, Vol.II (1981), No.8254, (7 November 1981), pp. 1037–1038.
- Meares, A., "Defences Against Hypnosis", British Journal of Medical Hypnotism, (Spring 1954), pp. 1–6.
- Meares, A., "Group Relaxing Hypnosis", Medical Journal of Australia, Vol.2 (1971), No.13, (25 September 1971), pp. 675–676.
- Meares, A., "History-taking and Physical Examination in Relation to Subsequent Hypnosis", Journal of Clinical and Experimental Hypnosis, Vol.II, No.4, (October 1954), pp. 291–295.
- Meares, A., "Hypnography – A Technique In Hypnoanalysis", Journal of Mental Science, Vol.100, No.421, (October 1954), pp. 965–974.
- Meares, A., "Hypnotherapy Without the Phenomena of Hypnosis", International Journal of Clinical and Experimental Hypnosis, Vol.XVI, No.4, (October 1968), pp. 211–214.
- Meares, A., "Meditation: A Psychological Approach to Cancer Treatment", The Practitioner, Vol.222, No.1327, (January 1979), pp. 119–122.
- Meares, A., "Mind and cancer (Letter)", Lancet, Vol.I (1979), No.8123, (5 May 1979), p. 978.
- Meares, A., "Non-Specific Suggestion", British Journal of Medical Hypnotism, Vol.7, No.2, (1956).
- Meares, A., "Non-Verbal And Extra-Verbal Suggestion In The Induction Of Hypnosis. Part 1. Non-Verbal Suggestion", British Journal of Medical Hypnotism, (Summer 1954), pp. 1–4.
- Meares, A., "Non-Verbal And Extra-Verbal Suggestion In The Induction Of Hypnosis. Part 2. Extra-Verbal Suggestion", British Journal of Medical Hypnotism, (Autumn 1954), pp. 1–4.
- Meares, A., "On The Nature Of Suggestibility", British Journal of Medical Hypnotism, (Summer 1956), pp. 3–8.
- Meares, A., "Our attitude of mind in the psychological treatment of cancer", Australian Nurses Journal, Vol.9, No.7, (February 1980), pp. 29–30.
- Meares, A., "Psychological Control of Organically Determined Pain", Annals of the Australian College of Dental Surgeons, Vol.1, (December 1967), pp. 42–46.
- Meares, A., "Psychological mechanisms in the regression of cancer", Medical Journal of Australia, Vol.1 (1983), No.12, (11 June 1983), pp. 583–584.
- Meares, A., "Rapport With The Patient: Symbolic Significance Of The Doctor's Behaviour", Lancet, Vol.II, (1954), No.6838, (18 September 1954), pp. 592–594.
- Meares, A., "Recent Work In Hypnosis And Its Relation To General Psychiatry. Lecture I", Medical Journal of Australia, Vol.I, No.1, (7 January 1956), pp. 1–5.
- Meares, A., "Recent Work In Hypnosis And Its Relation To General Psychiatry. Lecture II", Medical Journal of Australia, Vol.I, No.2, (14 January 1956), pp. 37–40.
- Meares, A., "Regression Of Cancer After Intensive Meditation Followed By Death", Medical Journal of Australia, Vol.2 (1977), No.11, (10 September 1977), pp. 374–375.
- Meares, A., "Regression of Cancer After Intensive Meditation", The Medical Journal of Australia, Vol.2, 1976, (31 July 1976), p. 184.
- Meares, A., "Regression of Cancer of the Rectum After Intensive Meditation", The Medical Journal of Australia, Vol.2, 1979, (17 November 1979), pp. 539–540.
- Meares, A., "Regression of Osteogenic Sarcoma Metastases Associated With Intensive Meditation", The Medical Journal of Australia, Vol.2, 1978, (21 October 1978), p. 433.
- Meares, A., "Regression of Recurrence of Carcinoma of the Breast at Mastectomy Site Associated with Intensive Meditation", Australian Family Physician, Vol.10, No.3, (March 1981), pp. 218–219.
- Meares, A., "Stress, meditation and the regression of cancer", Practitioner, Vol.226, No.1371, (September 1982), pp. 1607–1609.
- Meares, A., "Teaching the Patient Control of Organically Determined Pain", Medical Journal of Australia, Vol.1 (1967), No.1, (7 January 1967), pp. 11–12.
- Meares, A., "The Clinical Estimation of Suggestibility", Journal of Clinical and Experimental Hypnosis, Vol.II, No.2, (April 1954), pp. 106–108.
- Meares, A., "The Hysteroid Aspects Of Hypnosis", American Journal of Psychiatry, Vol.112, No.11, (May 1956), pp. 916–918.
- Meares, A., "The psychological treatment of cancer: The patient's confusion of the time for living with the time for dying", Australian Family Physician, Vol.8, No.7, (July 1979), pp. 801–805.
- Meares, A., "The Quality of Meditation Effective in the Regression of Cancer", Journal of the American Society of Psychosomatic Dentistry and Medicine, Vol.25, No.4, (1978), pp. 129–132.
- Meares, A., "The relief of anxiety through relaxing meditation", Australian Family Physician, Vol.5, No.7, (August 1976), pp. 906–910.
- Meares, A., "Theories of Hypnosis", pp. 390–405 in Schneck, J.M. (ed.), Hypnosis in Modern Medicine (Third Edition), Charles C. Thomas, (Springfield), 1963.
- Meares, A., "Vivid Visualization and Dim Visual Awareness in the Regression of Cancer in Meditation", Journal of the American Society of Psychosomatic Dentistry and Medicine, Vol.25, No.3, (1978), pp. 85–88.
- Meares, A., "What can the Cancer Patient Expect from Intensive Meditation?", Australian Family Physician, Vol.9, No.5, (May 1980), pp. 322–325.

== Selected books ==
- Meares, A., Hypnography: A Study in the Therapeutic Use of Hypnotic Painting, Charles C. Thomas, (Springfield), 1957.
- Meares, A., The Door of Serenity: a Study in the Therapeutic use of Symbolic Painting, Faber & Faber, (London),1958.
- Meares, A. Shapes of Sanity: A Study in the Therapeutic Use of Modelling in the Waking and Hypnotic State. Springfield, IL: Charles C. Thomas. (1960)
- Meares, A., A System of Medical Hypnosis, Julian Press, (New York), 1960.
- Meares, A., Relief Without Drugs: The Self-Management of Tension, Anxiety and Pain, Fontana, (Sydney), 1970.
- Meares, A., Cancer: Another way?, Hill of Content, (Melbourne), 1977.
- Meares, A., The Wealth Within: Self-Help Through a System of Relaxing Meditation, Hill of Content, (Melbourne), 1978.
- Meares, A., A Way of Doctoring, Hill of Content, (Melbourne), 1985.

== Other works ==
- The Medical Interview: A Study of Clinically Significant Interpersonal Reactions (1957)
- The Introvert (1958)
- The Management of the Anxious Patient (1963)
- Relief Without Drugs: The Self-Management of Tension, Anxiety and Pain (1967)
- Where Magic Lies (1968)
- Strange Places and Simple Truths (1969)
- Student Problems and a Guide to Study(1969)
- The Way Up: The Practical Psychology of Success (1970)
- How to be a Boss: A Practicing Psychiatrist on the Managing of Men (1971)
- Dialogue with Youth (1973)
- The New Woman (1974)
- Why be Old?: How to Avoid the Psychological Reactions of Ageing (1975)
- Let's Be Human (1976)
- From the Quiet Place: Mental Ataraxis: Thoughts on Meditation (1976)
- Marriage and Personality (1977)
- The Hidden Powers of Leadership (1978)
- My Soul and I (1982)
- Life Without Stress: the Self Management of Stress (1987)
- The Silver Years (1988)
- A Better Life (1989)
