= Author-level metrics =

Metrics of the bibliometric impact of individual authors

Author-level metrics are citation metrics that measure the bibliometric impact of individual authors, researchers, academics, and scholars. Many metrics have been developed that take into account varying numbers of factors (from only considering the total number of citations, to looking at their distribution across papers or journals using statistical or graph-theoretic principles).

These quantitative comparisons between researchers are mostly done to distribute resources (such as money and academic positions). However, there is still debate in the academic world about how effectively author-level metrics accomplish this objective.

Author-level metrics differ from journal-level metrics, which attempt to measure the bibliometric impact of academic journals rather than individuals, and from article-level metrics, which attempt to measure the impact of individual articles. However, metrics originally developed for academic journals can be reported at researcher level, such as the author-level eigenfactor and the author impact factor.

== List of metrics ==
Name	Description
h-index	The h-index asks "What is the largest h such that the author has at least h publications with at least h citations?" Formally, if f is the function that corresponds to the number of citations for each publication, the h-index is computed as follows. First, we order the values of f from the largest to the lowest value. Then, we look for the last position in which f is greater than or equal to the position (we call h this position). For example, if we have a researcher with 5 publications A, B, C, D, and E with 10, 8, 5, 4, and 3 citations, respectively, the h-index is equal to 4 because the 4th publication has 4 citations and the 5th has only 3. In contrast, if the same publications have 25, 8, 5, 3, and 3 citations, then the index is 3 because the fourth paper has only 3 citations.
Individual h-index	An individual h-index normalized by the number of authors has been proposed: $h_I = h^2/N_a^{(T)}$, with $N_a^{(T)}$ being the number of authors considered in the $h$ papers. It was found that the distribution of the h-index, although it depends on the field, can be normalized by a simple rescaling factor. For example, assuming as standard the hs for biology, the distribution of h for mathematics collapses with it if this h is multiplied by three, that is, a mathematician with h = 3 is equivalent to a biologist with h = 9. This method has not been readily adopted, perhaps because of its complexity.
Fractional h-index	To avoid incentivizing hyperauthorship, one may divide citation counts by the number of authors before ordering the papers and obtaining the fractional h-index, as originally suggested by Hirsch. This index, also called h-frac, is not highly correlated with h-index, and in 2021 was shown to correlate with scientific awards.
h^{2}	Three additional metrics have been proposed: h^{2} lower, h^{2} center, and h^{2} upper, to give a more accurate representation of the distribution shape. The three h^{2} metrics measure the relative area within a scientist's citation distribution in the low impact area, h^{2} lower, the area captured by the h-index, h^{2} center, and the area from publications with the highest visibility, h^{2} upper. Scientists with high h^{2} upper percentages are perfectionists, whereas scientists with high h^{2} lower percentages are mass producers. As these metrics are percentages, they are intended to give a qualitative description to supplement the quantitative h-index.
Field-weighted Citation Impact	Field-weighted Citation Impact (FWCI) is an author-level metric introduced and applied by Scopus SciVal. FWCI equals to the total citations actually received divided by the total citations that would be expected based on the average of the considered field. FWCI of 1 means that the output performs just as expected for the global average. More than 1 means that the author outperforms the average, and less than 1 means that the author underperforms. For instance, 1.55 means 55% more likely to be cited. While FWCI is natively calculated at the individual article level, these scores are also aggregated to evaluate overarching author-level impact.
Normalized h-index	The h-index has been shown to have a strong discipline bias. However, a simple normalization $h/\langle h \rangle_d$ by the average h of scholars in a discipline d is an effective way to mitigate this bias, obtaining a universal impact metric that allows comparison of scholars across different disciplines.
Author-level Eigenfactor	Author-level Eigenfactor is a version of Eigenfactor for single authors. Eigenfactor regards authors as nodes in a network of citations. The score of an author according to this metric is his or her eigenvector centrality in the network.
Erdős number	It has been argued that "For an individual researcher, a measure such as Erdős number captures the structural properties of the network whereas the h-index captures the citation impact of the publications. One can be easily convinced that ranking in coauthorship networks should take into account both measures to generate a realistic and acceptable ranking." Several author ranking systems have been proposed already, for instance the Phys Author Rank Algorithm.
i10-index	The i10 index indicates the number of academic publications an author has written that have been cited by at least 10 sources. It was introduced in July 2011 by Google as part of their work on Google Scholar.
RG Score	ResearchGate Score or RG Score is an author-level metric introduced by ResearchGate in 2012. According to ResearchGate's CEO Dr. Ijad Madisch, "[t]he RG Score allows real-time feedback from the people who matter: the scientists themselves." RG Score has been reported to be correlated with existing author-level metrics and has an undisclosed calculation methodology. Two studies reported that RG Score seems to incorporate the journal impact factors into the calculation. The RG Score was found to be negatively correlated with network centrality – users that are the most active on ResearchGate usually do not have high RG scores. It was also found to be strongly positively correlated with Quacquarelli Symonds university rankings at the institutional level, but only weakly with Elsevier SciVal rankings of individual authors. While it was found to be correlated with different university rankings, the correlation in between these rankings themselves was higher.
m-index	The m-index is defined as h/n, where h is the h-index and n is the number of years since the first published paper of the scientist; also called m-quotient.
g-index	For g-index is introduced in 2006 as largest number of top g articles, which have received together at least g^{2} citations.
e-index	The e-index, the square root of surplus citations for the h-set beyond h^{2}, complements the h-index for ignored citations, and therefore is especially useful for highly cited scientists and for comparing those with the same h-index (iso-h-index group).
c-index	The c-index accounts not only for the citations but for the quality of the citations in terms of the collaboration distance between citing and cited authors. A scientist has c-index n if n of [his/her] N citations are from authors which are at collaboration distance at least n, and the other (N − n) citations are from authors which are at collaboration distance at most n.
o-index	The o-index corresponds to the geometric mean of the h-index and the most cited paper of a researcher.
Hr-index	Rivesed H-index Q = H/√N, or Q = H/N, where H is H-index and N is the total number of publications of a researcher. A more sophisticated version is Q = H/N^{0.68}, which is fitted from the average Q of a list of the top 2% scholars in all fields of science based on comprehensive metrics at Jeroen Baas, Kevin Boyack, John P.A. Ioannidis (19 October 2021). "August 2021 data-update for 'Updated science-wide author databases of standardized citation indicators'". Elsevier BV. doi:10.17632/btchxktzyw.3. The Hr-index or q-index is an intensive index that measures the average quality of the papers in citation published by a researcher.
RA-index	The RA-index accommodates improving the sensitivity of the h-index on the number of highly cited papers and has many cited paper and uncited paper under the h-core. This improvement can enhance the measurement sensitivity of the h-index.
L-index	L-index combines the number of citations, the number of coauthors, the age of publications into a single value, which is independent of the number of publications and conveniently ranges from 0.0 to 9.9. With c as number of citations, a as number of authors and y as number of years, L-index is defined by the formula: $$L=\ln\left({\sum_{i}{\frac{c_i}{a_i y_i}}}\right)+1$$ L-index is automatically calculated by the Exaly database.
s-index	An s-index, accounting for the non-entropic distribution of citations, has been proposed and it has been shown to be in a very good correlation with h.
w-index	w-index is defined as follow: if w of a researcher's papers have at least 10w citations each and the other papers have fewer than 10(w + 1) citations, that researcher's w-index is w.
Author Impact Factor	Author Impact Factor (AIF) is the impact factor applied to authors. The AIF of an author $X$ in year $y$ is the mean number of citations given by papers published in year y to papers published by X in a period of $\Delta y$ years before year y. Unlike the h-index, AIF is able to capture trends and variations of the impact of the scientific output of scientists over time, which is a growing measure taking into account the whole career path.
Disruptive and Consolidating Metrics	A set of metrics based on citation network analysis, distinguishing disruptive and consolidating impact: SDC (Scientists' Disruptive Citation) sums citations reflecting divergence from prior work; SCC (Scientists' Consolidating Citation) sums citations building on existing research; D h-index is the maximum number of papers with at least that number of disruptive citations; C h-index is the maximum number of papers with at least that number of consolidating citations.

=== Additional variations of h-index ===
There are a number of models proposed to incorporate the relative contribution of each author to a paper, for instance by accounting for the rank in the sequence of authors. A generalization of the h-index and some other indices that gives additional information about the shape of the author's citation function (heavy-tailed, flat/peaked, etc.) has been proposed. Because the h-index was never meant to measure future publication success, recently, a group of researchers has investigated the features that are most predictive of future h-index. It is possible to try the predictions using an online tool. However, later work has shown that since h-index is a cumulative measure, it contains intrinsic auto-correlation that led to significant overestimation of its predictability. Thus, the true predictability of future h-index is much lower than what has been claimed before. The h-index can be timed to analyze its evolution during one's career, employing different time windows.

== Criticism ==
Some academics, such as physicist Jorge E. Hirsch, have praised author-level metrics as a "useful yardstick with which to compare, in an unbiased way, different individuals competing for the same resource when an important evaluation criterion is scientific achievement". However, other members of the scientific community, and even Hirsch himself, have criticized them as particularly susceptible to gaming the system.

Work in bibliometrics has demonstrated multiple techniques for the manipulation of popular author-level metrics. The most used metric h-index can be manipulated through self-citations, and even computer-generated nonsense documents can be used for that purpose, for example using SCIgen. Metrics can also be manipulated by coercive citation, a practice in which an editor of a journal forces authors to add spurious citations to their own articles before the journal will agree to publish it.

Additionally, if the h-index is considered as a decision criterion for research funding agencies, the game-theoretic solution to this competition implies increasing the average length of coauthors' lists. A study analyzing >120 million papers in the specific field of biology showed that the validity of citation-based measures is being compromised and their usefulness is lessening. As predicted by Goodhart's law, quantity of publications is not a good metric anymore as a result of shorter papers and longer author lists.

Leo Szilard, the inventor of the nuclear chain reaction, also expressed criticism of the decision-making system for scientific funding in his book "The Voice of the Dolphins and Other Stories". Senator J. Lister Hill read excerpts of this criticism in a 1962 senate hearing on the slowing of government-funded cancer research. Szilard's work focuses on metrics slowing scientific progress, rather than on specific methods of gaming:

As a matter of fact, I think it would be quite easy. You could set up a foundation, with an annual endowment of thirty million dollars. Research workers in need of funds could apply for grants, if they could mail out a convincing case. Have ten committees, each committee, each composed of twelve scientists, appointed to pass on these applications. Take the most active scientists out of the laboratory and make them members of these committees. And the very best men in the field should be appointed as chairman at salaries of fifty thousand dollars each. Also have about twenty prizes of one hundred thousand dollars each for the best scientific papers of the year. This is just about all you would have to do. Your lawyers could easily prepare a charter for the foundation. As a matter of fact, any of the National Science Foundation bills which were introduced in the Seventy-ninth and Eightieth Congress could perfectly well serve as a model.

First of all, the best scientists would be removed from their laboratories and kept busy on committees passing on applications for funds. Secondly the scientific workers in need of funds would concentrate on problems which were considered promising and were pretty certain to lead to publishable results. For a few years there might be a great increase in scientific output; but by going after the obvious, pretty soon science would dry out. Science would become something like a parlor game. Somethings would be considered interesting, others not. There would be fashions. Those who followed the fashions would get grants. Those who wouldn't would not, and pretty soon they would learn to follow the fashion, too.

== See also ==
- Academic age
- Goodhart's law
- Scientometrics
