= Iain Chalmers =

British medical researcher

Sir Iain Chalmers
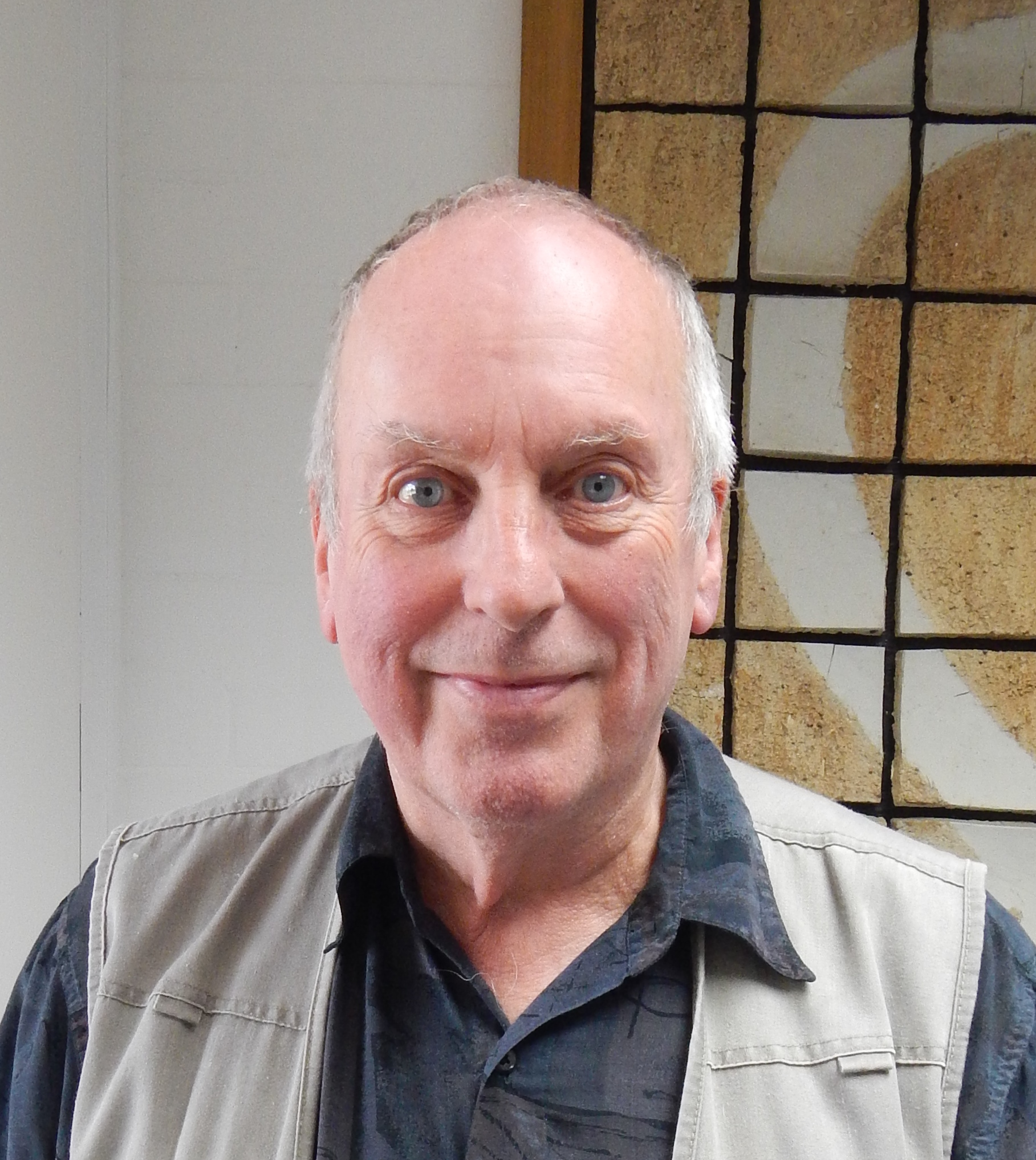
- Born: Iain Geoffrey Chalmers
- Education: Middlesex Hospital Medical School, University of London (MBBS)
- Known for: Cochrane
- Awards: Knight Bachelor (2000); FRCP; FRCPE; FFPH; FCOG(SA); C.-E. A. Winslow Medal, Yale, 2010; BMJ Lifetime Achievement Award (2014)

Sir Iain Geoffrey Chalmers is a British health services researcher, one of the founders of the Cochrane Collaboration, and coordinator of the James Lind Initiative, which includes the James Lind Library and James Lind Alliance.

== Education and career ==
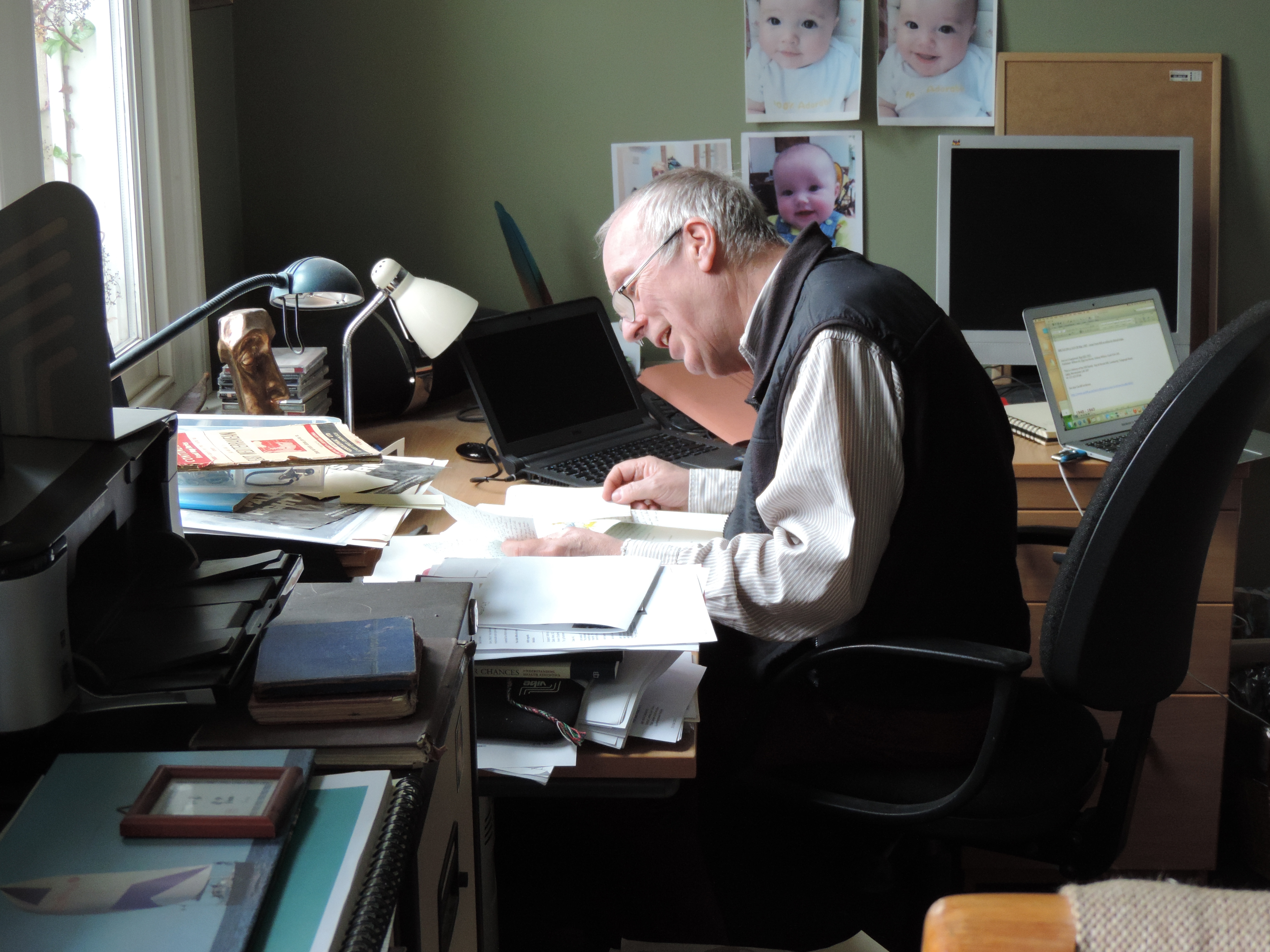
Iain Chalmers in his office at home in Oxford (2015).

Chalmers qualified in medicine in the mid-1960s, and then practised as a clinician in the United Kingdom and two years (1969–1970) in the Gaza Strip. In the mid-1970s, he became a full-time health services researcher with a particular interest in assessing the effects of care.

Between 1978 and 1992, he was the first director of the National Perinatal Epidemiology Unit in Oxford. There, Chalmers led the development of the electronic Oxford Database of Perinatal Trials (ODPT) and a collection of systematic reviews of randomized trials of care in pregnancy and children published in the two-volume Effective Care in Pregnancy and Childbirth, co-authoring its summary, Guide to Effective Care in Pregnancy and Childbirth.

The National Health Service Research and Development Programme supported extending the approach to other areas of health care. In 1992, Chalmers was appointed director of the UK Cochrane Centre, leading to the development of the international Cochrane Collaboration.

Subsequently, he became founding editor of the James Lind Library, which documents the history and evolution of fair trials of treatments, and helped to establish the James Lind Alliance, a non-profit organization that "aims to identify the most important gaps in knowledge about the effects of treatments". The Library has established strategic agreements with international and non-profit organizations to disseminate its publications to a broad international and multilingual audience. Chalmers inspired champions all over the world leading to the development of the Cochrane Collaboration and by 2011 this collaboration had nearly 30,000 volunteers contributing towards summarising research evidence to improve health. His contributions have been instrumental in advancing international policies on research for health -such as PAHO's Policy on Research for Health, and to promote a better understanding of the importance of building bridges between users and producers of research for health policy and health care delivery.

Chalmers was knighted in 2000. He continues to promote better research for better health care by increasing public appreciation of good research through Testing Treatments interactive and the James Lind Library, and by working with others to reduce waste in research.

== Publications ==
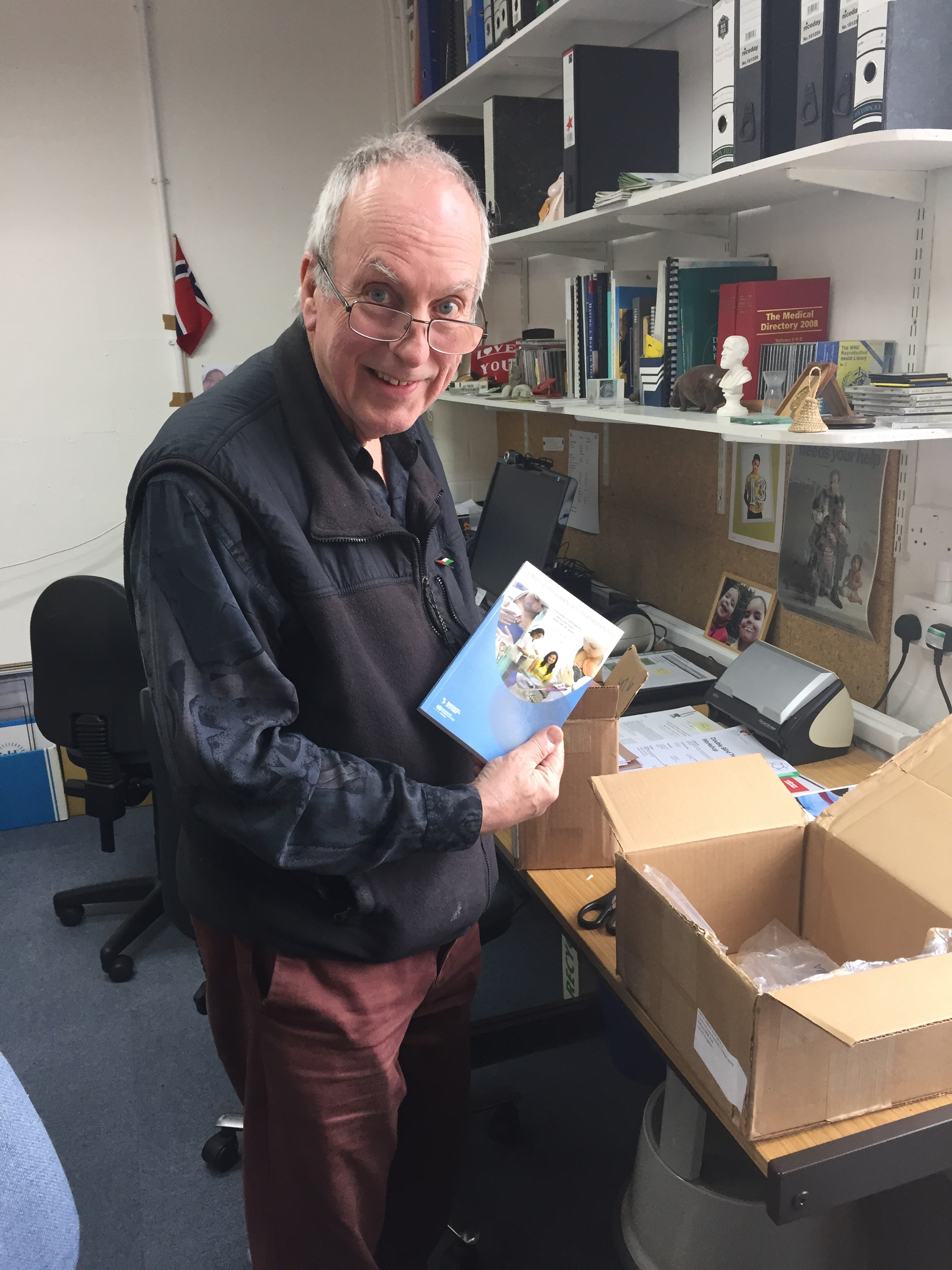
Iain Chalmers in his office, Middletown Pavilion, Middle Way, Oxford, on the arrival of the Spanish translation of the book, Testing Treatments (2015).

- A Classified Bibliography of Controlled Trials in Perinatal Medicine 1940 – 1984
- Effectiveness and Satisfaction in Antenatal Care
- Effective Care in Pregnancy and Childbirth
- Britain's gift: a "Medline" of synthesised evidence
- Empirical Evidence of Bias
- The origins, evolution and future of the Cochrane Database of Systematic Reviews
- Restore true open access to bmj.com
- Systematic Reviews: Reporting, updating, and correcting systematic reviews of the effects of health care
- Select Committee on Health: Memorandum by Sir Iain Chalmers (PI 29)
- James Lind Library
- Testing Treatments
- Testing Treatments Interactive

== My Death, My Decision ==
Chalmers is a patron of the right to die organization My Death, My Decision. My Death, My Decision wants to see a more compassionate approach to dying in the UK, including giving people the legal right to a physician-assisted death if that is their persistent wish.
