= NPEU =

NPEU may refer to:

- National Perinatal Epidemiology Unit, a multi-disciplinary research unit within the Nuffield Department of Women's and Reproductive Health at Oxford University.
- Nonprofit Professional Employees Union, a part of the International Federation of Professional and Technical Engineers, it represents employees of over 40 nonprofit organizations across the United States.
