= Judith M. Lumley =

Australian public health academic

Judith Lumley AM
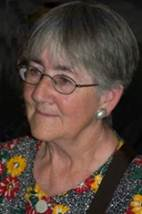
- Judith Lumley at her retirement celebration, 2009
- Born: Judith Mary Casey; 15 February 1941; Cardiff, Wales
- Died: 25 October 2018 (aged 77); Melbourne, Australia
- Education: Cambridge University; Monash University
- Known for: Improving maternity services in Australia; Birth Rites, Birth Rights (1980); Having a Baby in Victoria (1990)
- Spouse: Peter Lumley (m. 1964)
- Awards: Sidney Sax Public Health Medal (2002); Order of Australia (2005)
- Scientific career
- Fields: Public health; Epidemiology; Maternal and child health
- Workplaces: Monash University; La Trobe University; Oxford University
- Thesis: The uses of scalp blood collection in the study of the human fetus (1971)

Judith Mary Lumley AM (15 February 1941 – 25 October 2018) had a career as an academic, author, public health advocate and perinatal researcher, retiring as Professor Emerita at La Trobe University in December 2008.

== Early life and education ==
Lumley was born Judith Mary Casey in Cardiff, Wales in 1941. She graduated first from Cambridge University in 1962 and married Peter Lumley in 1964, emigrating to Australia a year later. She completed a medical degree at Monash University in Melbourne, Australia. She gained her PhD in fetal physiology working on fetal acidosis in labor at the Monash Department of Obstetrics and Gynaecology, and became a Fellow of both the UK and Australian Faculties of Public Health Medicine and Professor at La Trobe University.

== Career ==
Lumley worked in academic teaching and research in both pediatrics and obstetrics and gynecology for several years, before establishing and directing the Victorian Perinatal Data Collection in 1982. In 1988, she chaired the Victorian Ministerial Review of Birthing Services. In 1991 she established a research centre at Monash University, which later moved to La Trobe University. Lumley was director of that Centre until 2008, with the exception of two years as Director of the National Perinatal Epidemiology Unit at Oxford University (1994-1995). Originally called the Centre for the Study of Mothers' and Children's Health, then Mother & Child Health Research, the name was changed to the Judith Lumley Centre in 2013. She retired after the onset of Alzheimer's disease.

=== Research ===
Judith Lumley published research in a variety of disciplines and methods, including epidemiology, evaluation of effectiveness and qualitative research. She was an early and longtime contributor to the development of the Cochrane Collaboration. Lumley had three sons. She died in October 2018.

=== Medical journal editorship ===
Lumley was co-editor of the Australian and New Zealand Journal of Public Health from 2000 to 2008, and also edited Australian Family Physician for several years. She served on The Lancet's international advisory board.

== Books ==
- Birth Rites, Birth Rights: Childbirth alternatives for Australian parents - by Judith Lumley and Jill Astbury (1980).
- Prepregnancy care: A manual for practice - edited by Geoffrey Chamberlain and Judith Lumley (1986).
- Having a baby in Victoria: Final report of the Ministerial Review of Birthing Services in Victoria - Chaired by Judith Lumley (1990).
- Missing voices: The experience of motherhood - by Stephanie Brown, Jill Astbury, Judith Lumley, Rhonda Small (1994).

== Awards and honors ==
Lumley was a life member of the Public Health Association of Australia. Life membership is granted for "exemplary service to the Association."

In 2002, Lumley was awarded the Sidney Sax Public Health Medal, for "more than two decades of work dedicated to the promotion of public health and for her efforts in improving maternal care in Australia." This medal is the Public Health Association of Australia's pre-eminent prize for a person who has made a "notable contribution" to public health in Australia. It is competitive and awarded annually.

Lumley was awarded a position in the 'Smart 100' in 2003. This was a list of "the smartest, most innovative and most creative" people in a variety of fields in Australia organized by The Bulletin magazine.

Lumley was appointed an Honorary Member of the Order of Australia in 2005, cited "for service to promoting public health and improving maternity care in Australia."

The Faculty of Health Sciences of La Trobe University established the Judith Lumley Scholarship for high-achieving higher degree students in maternal and child health research.

In 2013, the name of Mother and Child Health Research at La Trobe University was formally changed to the Judith Lumley Centre.
