= ResearchGate =

Scientific social network (launched 2008)

- Website type: Social network service for scientists
- Available in: English
- Headquarters: Berlin, Germany
- Area served: Worldwide
- Owner: ResearchGate GmbH
- Creators: Ijad Madisch; Sören Hofmayer; Horst Fickenscher
- Industry: Internet
- Website: www.researchgate.net
- Users: ▲25 million (September 2023)
- Launched: May 2008 (18 years ago)
- Current status: active

ResearchGate is a commercial social networking site for scientists and researchers to share papers, ask and answer questions, and find collaborators. According to a 2014 study by Nature and a 2016 article in Times Higher Education, it is the largest academic social network in terms of active users, although other services have more registered users, and a 2015–2016 survey suggests that almost as many academics have Google Scholar profiles.

While reading articles does not require registration, people who wish to become site members need to have an email address at a recognized institution or to be manually confirmed as a published researcher in order to sign up for an account. Articles are free to read by visitors; however additional features (such as job postings or advertisements) are accessible only as a paid subscription. Members of the site each have a user profile and can upload research output including papers, data, chapters, negative results, patents, research proposals, methods, presentations, and software source code. Users may also follow the activities of other users and engage in discussions with them. Users are also able to block interactions with other users.

The site has been criticized for sending unsolicited email invitations to coauthors of the articles listed on the site that were written to appear as if the email messages were sent by the other coauthors of the articles (a practice the site said it had discontinued as of November 2016) and for automatically generating apparent profiles for non-users who have sometimes felt misrepresented by them. A study found that over half of the uploaded papers appear to infringe copyright, because the authors uploaded the publisher's version.

== Features ==
The New York Times described the site as a mashup of Facebook, Twitter, and LinkedIn. Site members may follow a research interest, in addition to following other individual members. It has a blogging feature for users to write short reviews on peer-reviewed articles. ResearchGate indexes self-published information on user profiles to suggest members to connect with others who have similar interests. When a member posts a question, it is fielded to others that have identified on their user profile that they have a relevant expertise. It also has private chat rooms where users can share data, edit shared documents, or discuss confidential topics. The site also features a research-focused job board.

As of 2020, it has more than 17 million users, with its largest user-bases coming from Europe and North America. Most of ResearchGate's users are involved in medicine or biology, though it also has participants from engineering, law, computer science, agricultural sciences, and psychology, among others.

ResearchGate published an author-level metric in the form of an "RG Score" since 2012. RG score is not a citation impact measure. RG Scores have been reported to be correlated with existing author-level metrics, but have also been criticized as having questionable reliability and an unknown calculation methodology. In March 2022 ResearchGate announced they would remove the RG Score after July 2022. ResearchGate does not charge fees for putting content on the site and does not require peer review.

== History ==
ResearchGate was founded in 2008 by virologist Ijad Madisch, who remains the company's CEO, with physician Sören Hofmayer, and computer scientist Horst Fickenscher. It started in Boston, Massachusetts, and moved to Berlin, Germany, shortly afterwards.

The company's first round of funding, in 2010, was led by the venture capital firm Benchmark. Benchmark partner Matt Cohler became a member of the board and participated in the decision to move to Berlin.

The website began with few features, and developed based on input from scientists. From 2009 to 2011, the number of users of the site grew from 25,000 to more than 1 million.

A second round of funding led by Peter Thiel's Founders Fund was announced in February 2012. On June 4, 2013, it closed Series C financing arrangements for $35M from investors including Bill Gates.

The company grew from 12 employees in 2011 to 120 in 2014. As of 2016, it had about 300 employees, including a sales staff of 100.

ResearchGate's competitors include Academia.edu, Google Scholar, and Mendeley, as well as new competitors that emerged in the last decade like Semantic Scholar. In 2016, Academia.edu reportedly had more registered users (about 34 million versus 11 million) and higher web traffic, but ResearchGate was substantially larger in terms of active usage by researchers. The fact that ResearchGate restricts its user accounts to people at recognized institutions and published researchers may explain the disparity in active usage, as a high percentage of the accounts on Academia.edu are lapsed or inactive. In a 2015–2016 survey of academic profile tools, about as many respondents have ResearchGate profiles and Google Scholar profiles, but almost twice as many respondents use Google Scholar for search than use ResearchGate for accessing publications.

Madisch has said the company's business strategy is focused on highly targeted advertising based on analysis of the activities of users, saying "Imagine you could click on a microscope mentioned in a paper and buy it", and estimating the spending on science at $1 trillion per year under the control of a "relatively small number of people".

In November 2015 they acquired additional funding of $52.6 million from a range of investors including Goldman Sachs, Benchmark Capital, Wellcome Trust and Bill Gates, but did not announce this until February 2017. Losses increased from €5.4m in 2014 to €6.2m in 2015, but ResearchGate's CEO expressed optimism that they would break even eventually.

ResearchGate, Elsevier and American Chemical Society settled their lawsuit on 15 September 2023.

As of January 2023, ResearchGate has partnered with Sage to distribute open access content.

== Reception ==
A 2009 article in BusinessWeek reported that ResearchGate was a "potentially powerful link" in promoting innovation in developing countries by connecting scientists from those nations with their peers in industrialized nations. It said the website had become popular largely due to its ease of use. It also said that ResearchGate had been involved in several notable cross-country collaborations between scientists that led to substantive developments.

Academic reception of ResearchGate remains generally positive, as recent reviews of extant literature show an accepting audience with broad coverage of concepts. A 2012 paper published in The International Information & Library Review conducted a survey with 160 respondents and reported that out of those respondents using social networking "for academic purposes", Facebook and ResearchGate were the most popular at the University of Delhi, but also "a majority of respondents said using SNSs [Social Networking Sites] may be a waste of time".

Although ResearchGate is used internationally, its uptake—as of 2014—is uneven, with Brazil having particularly many users and China having few when compared to the number of publishing researchers.

In a 2014 study by Nature, 88 percent of the responding scientists and engineers said that they were aware of ResearchGate and would use it when "contacted", but less than 10% said they would use it to actively discuss research with 40% instead preferring to use Twitter when discussing research. ResearchGate was visited regularly by half of those surveyed by Nature, coming second to Google Scholar. 29 percent of regular visitors had signed up for a profile on ResearchGate in the past year, and 35% of the survey participants were invited by email.

A 2016 article in Times Higher Education reported that in a global survey of 20,670 people who use academic social networking sites, ResearchGate was the dominant network and was twice as popular as others: 61 percent of respondents who had published at least one paper had a ResearchGate profile. Another study reported that "relatively few academics appear to post questions and answers", but instead use it only as an "online CV".

In the context of the big deal cancellations by several library systems in the world, the wide usage of ResearchGate was credited as one of the factors which reduced the apparent value of the subscriptions to toll access resources. Data analysis tools like Unpaywall Journals, used by libraries to calculate the real costs and value of their options before such decisions, allow to separate ResearchGate from open archives like institutional repositories, which are considered more stable.

== Criticism ==
ResearchGate's decision to not remove convicted sex offenders from its social networking site has been criticized by Canadian authorities. Many researchers world-wide deleted their account in protest as they refused to remove convicted child pornographer and registered sex offender in Canada, Ben Levin as a user. Identified on ResearchGate as "Research Ben", he had been a frequent user of ResearchGate, publishing over 80 papers of interest with the vast majority dealing with studies around child pornography and pedophiles.

ResearchGate has been criticized for emailing unsolicited invitations to the coauthors of its users. These emails were written as if they were personally sent by the user, but were instead sent automatically unless the user opted out, which caused some researchers to boycott the service and contributes to the negative view of ResearchGate in the scientific community. As of November 2016, the site appears to have discontinued this practice. The TechCrunch moderator Mike Butcher accused ResearchGate of having scraped competitors' websites for email addresses to spam, which the ResearchGate CEO denied.

A study published by the Association for Information Systems in 2014 found that a dormant account on ResearchGate, using default settings, generated 297 invitations to 38 people over a 16-month period, and that the user profile was automatically attributed to more than 430 publications. Furthermore, journalists and researchers found that the RG score, calculated by ResearchGate via a proprietary algorithm, can reach high values under questionable circumstances.

Several studies have looked at the RG score, for which details about how it is calculated are not published. These studies concluded that the RG score was "intransparent and irreproducible", criticized the way it incorporates the journal impact factor into the user score, and suggested that it should "not be considered in the evaluation of academics". The results were confirmed in a second "response" study, which also found the score to depend mostly on journal impact factors. The RG score was found to be negatively correlated with network centrality, i.e., that users that are the most active (and thus central to the network) on ResearchGate usually do not have high RG scores. It was also found to be strongly positively correlated with Quacquarelli Symonds university rankings at the institutional level, but only weakly with Elsevier SciVal rankings of individual authors. While it was found to be correlated with different university rankings, the correlation in between these rankings themselves was higher. Nature also reported that "Some of the apparent profiles on the site are not owned by real people, but are created automatically – and incompletely – by scraping details of people's affiliations, publication records and PDFs, if available, from around the web. That annoys researchers who do not want to be on the site, and who feel that the pages misrepresent them – especially when they discover that ResearchGate will not take down the pages when asked." ResearchGate uses a crawler to find PDF versions of articles on the homepages of authors and publishers. These are then presented as if they had been uploaded to the web site by the author: the PDF will be displayed embedded in a frame, and only the button label "External Download" indicates that the file was in fact not uploaded to ResearchGate.

ResearchGate has been criticized for failing to provide safeguards against "the dark side of academic writing", including such phenomena as fake publishers, "ghost journals", publishers with "predatory" publication fees, and fake impact ratings. It has also been criticized for copyright infringement of published works.

In September 2017, lawyers representing the International Association of Scientific, Technical, and Medical Publishers (STM) sent a letter to ResearchGate threatening legal action against them for copyright infringement and demanding that they alter their handling of uploaded articles to include pre-release checking for copyright violations and "Specifically, [for ResearchGate to] end its extraction of content from hosted articles and the modification of any hosted content, including any and all metadata. It would also mean an end to Researchgate's own copying and downloading of published journal article content and the creation of internal databases of articles." This was followed by an announcement that takedown requests are to be issued to ResearchGate for copyright infringement relating to millions of articles. A statement supporting the action was issued by a group called Coalition for Responsible Sharing, and the statement was signed by the American Chemical Society, Brill Publishers, Elsevier, Wiley, and Wolters Kluwer. Subsequently, Coalition for Responsible Sharing (CfRS) reported that "ResearchGate has removed from public view a significant number of copyrighted articles it is hosting on its site". CfRS also confirmed that "not all violations have been addressed" and as such, takedown notices have been issued.

ResearchGate has managed to achieve an agreement on article uploading with three other major publishers, Springer Nature, Cambridge University Press and Thieme. Under the agreement, the publishers will be notified when their articles are uploaded but will not be able to premoderate uploads.
