= Sugeno integral =

In mathematics, the Sugeno integral, introduced by Michio Sugeno as a fuzzy integral in work on fuzzy measures at the Tokyo Institute of Technology, is a type of integral with respect to a fuzzy measure.

Let $(X,\Omega)$ be a measurable space and let $h:X\to[0,1]$ be an $\Omega$-measurable function.

The Sugeno integral over the crisp set $A \subseteq X$ of the function $h$ with respect to the fuzzy measure $g$ is defined by:

$$\int_A h(x) \circ g
= {\sup_{E\subseteq X}} \left[\min\left(\min_{x\in E} h(x), g(A\cap E)\right)\right]
= {\sup_{\alpha\in [0,1]}} \left[\min\left(\alpha, g(A\cap F_\alpha)\right)\right]$$

where $F_\alpha = \left\{x | h(x) \geq \alpha \right\}$.

The Sugeno integral over the fuzzy set $\tilde{A}$ of the function $h$ with respect to the fuzzy measure $g$ is defined by:

$$\int_A h(x) \circ g
= \int_X \left[h_A(x) \wedge h(x)\right] \circ g$$

where $h_A(x)$ is the membership function of the fuzzy set $\tilde{A}$.

== Usage and Relationships ==
Sugeno integral is related to h-index.
