= Fuzzy measure theory =

Theory of generalized measures in mathematics

In mathematics, fuzzy measure theory considers generalized measures in which the additive property is replaced by the weaker property of monotonicity. The central concept of fuzzy measure theory is the fuzzy measure (also capacity, see), which was introduced by Choquet in 1953 and independently defined by Sugeno in 1974 in the context of fuzzy integrals. There exists a number of different classes of fuzzy measures including plausibility/belief measures, possibility/necessity measures, and probability measures, which are a subset of classical measures.

== Definitions ==
Let $\mathbf{X}$ be a universe of discourse, $\mathcal{C}$ be a class of subsets of $\mathbf{X}$, and $E,F\in\mathcal{C}$. A function $g:\mathcal{C}\to\mathbb{R}$ where

1. $\emptyset \in \mathcal{C} \Rightarrow g(\emptyset)=0$
2. $E \subseteq F \Rightarrow g(E)\leq g(F)$

is called a fuzzy measure. A fuzzy measure is called normalized or regular if $g(\mathbf{X})=1$.

== Properties of fuzzy measures ==
A fuzzy measure is:

- additive if for any $E,F \in \mathcal{C}$ such that $E \cap F = \emptyset$, we have $g(E \cup F) = g(E) + g(F).$;
- supermodular if for any $E,F \in \mathcal{C}$, we have $g(E \cup F) + g(E \cap F) \geq g(E) + g(F)$;
- submodular if for any $E,F \in \mathcal{C}$, we have $g(E \cup F) + g(E \cap F) \leq g(E) + g(F)$;
- superadditive if for any $E,F \in \mathcal{C}$ such that $E \cap F = \emptyset$, we have $g(E \cup F) \geq g(E) + g(F)$;
- subadditive if for any $E,F \in \mathcal{C}$ such that $E \cap F = \emptyset$, we have $g(E \cup F) \leq g(E) + g(F)$;
- symmetric if for any $E,F \in \mathcal{C}$, we have $|E| = |F|$ implies $g(E) = g(F)$;
- Boolean if for any $E \in \mathcal{C}$, we have $g(E) = 0$ or $g(E) = 1$.

Understanding the properties of fuzzy measures is useful in application. When a fuzzy measure is used to define a function such as the Sugeno integral or Choquet integral, these properties will be crucial in understanding the function's behavior. For instance, the Choquet integral with respect to an additive fuzzy measure reduces to the Lebesgue integral. In discrete cases, a symmetric fuzzy measure will result in the ordered weighted averaging (OWA) operator. Submodular fuzzy measures result in convex functions, while supermodular fuzzy measures result in concave functions when used to define a Choquet integral.

== Möbius representation ==
Let g be a fuzzy measure. The Möbius representation of g is given by the set function M, where for every $E,F \subseteq X$,

$$M(E) = \sum_{F \subseteq E} (-1)^{|E \backslash F|} g(F).$$

The equivalent axioms in Möbius representation are:

1. $M(\emptyset)=0$.
2. $\sum_{F \subseteq E|i \in F} M(F) \geq 0$, for all $E \subseteq \mathbf{X}$ and all $i \in E$

A fuzzy measure in Möbius representation M is called normalized if $\sum_{E \subseteq \mathbf{X}}M(E)=1.$

Möbius representation can be used to give an indication of which subsets of X interact with one another. For instance, an additive fuzzy measure has Möbius values all equal to zero except for singletons. The fuzzy measure g in standard representation can be recovered from the Möbius form using the Zeta transform:

$$g(E) = \sum_{F \subseteq E} M(F), \forall E \subseteq \mathbf{X} .$$

== Simplification assumptions for fuzzy measures ==
Fuzzy measures are defined on a semiring of sets or monotone class, which may be as granular as the power set of X, and even in discrete cases the number of variables can be as large as 2^{|X|}. For this reason, in the context of multi-criteria decision analysis and other disciplines, simplification assumptions on the fuzzy measure have been introduced so that it is less computationally expensive to determine and use. For instance, when it is assumed the fuzzy measure is additive, it will hold that $g(E) = \sum_{i \in E} g(\{i\})$ and the values of the fuzzy measure can be evaluated from the values on X. Similarly, a symmetric fuzzy measure is defined uniquely by |X| values. Two important fuzzy measures that can be used are the Sugeno- or $\lambda$-fuzzy measure and k-additive measures, introduced by Sugeno and Grabisch respectively.

=== Sugeno λ-measure ===
The Sugeno $\lambda$-measure is a special case of fuzzy measures defined iteratively. It has the following definition:

==== Definition ====
Let $\mathbf{X} = \left\lbrace x_1,\dots,x_n \right\rbrace$ be a finite set and let $\lambda \in (-1,+\infty)$. A Sugeno $\lambda$-measure is a function $g:2^X\to[0,1]$ such that

1. $g(X) = 1$.
2. if $A, B\subseteq \mathbf{X}$ (alternatively $A, B\in 2^{\mathbf{X}}$) with $A \cap B = \emptyset$ then $g(A \cup B) =g(A)+g(B)+\lambda g(A)g(B)$.

As a convention, the value of g at a singleton set $\left\lbrace x_i \right\rbrace$ is called a density and is denoted by $g_i = g(\left\lbrace x_i \right\rbrace)$. In addition, we have that $\lambda$ satisfies the property

$$\lambda +1 = \prod_{i=1}^n (1+\lambda g_i)$$.

Tahani and Keller as well as Wang and Klir have shown that once the densities are known, it is possible to use the previous polynomial to obtain the values of $\lambda$ uniquely.

=== k-additive fuzzy measure ===
The k-additive fuzzy measure limits the interaction between the subsets $E \subseteq X$ to size $|E|=k$. This drastically reduces the number of variables needed to define the fuzzy measure, and as k can be anything from 1 (in which case the fuzzy measure is additive) to X, it allows for a compromise between modelling ability and simplicity.

==== Definition ====
A discrete fuzzy measure g on a set X is called k-additive ($1 \leq k \leq |\mathbf{X}|$) if its Möbius representation verifies $M(E) = 0$, whenever $|E| > k$ for any $E \subseteq \mathbf{X}$, and there exists a subset F with k elements such that $M(F) \neq 0$.

== Shapley and interaction indices ==
In game theory, the Shapley value or Shapley index is used to indicate the weight of a game. Shapley values can be calculated for fuzzy measures in order to give some indication of the importance of each singleton. In the case of additive fuzzy measures, the Shapley value will be the same as each singleton.

For a given fuzzy measure g, and $|\mathbf{X}|=n$, the Shapley index for every $i,\dots,n \in X$ is:

$$\phi (i) = \sum_{E \subseteq \mathbf{X} \backslash \{i\}} \frac{(n-|E|-1)!|E|!}{n!} [g(E \cup \{i\}) - g(E)].$$

The Shapley value is the vector $\mathbf{\phi}(g) = (\psi(1),\dots,\psi(n)).$

== See also ==
- Probability theory
- Possibility theory
