= Academic authorship =

Credit for published scholarly work

Academic authorship of journal articles, books, and other original works is a means by which academics communicate the results of their scholarly work, establish priority for their discoveries, and build their reputation among their peers. Through authorship, researchers, assistants, interns, students, and other involved parties (e.g., citizen scientists, academic consortia) receive credit for their contributions and can be held responsible and accountable for the quality and integrity of the work.

Authorship is a primary basis that employers use to evaluate academic personnel for employment, promotion, and tenure. In academic publishing, authorship of a work is typically claimed by those making intellectual contributions to the research described in the work. However, many scholarly journals also require that potential authors contribute to the writing of the article about the work, not just the work itself. Such requirements, as well as other norms around authorship in disciplines, can be controversial. In these contexts, authorship can encompass activities other than writing the article; a researcher who comes up with an experimental design and analyzes the data may be considered an author, even if she or he had little role in composing the text describing the results. According to some standards, even writing the entire article would not constitute authorship unless the writer was also involved in at least one other phase of the project.

== Definition ==
Guidelines for assigning authorship vary between institutions and disciplines. They may be formally defined or simply cultural norms. Incorrect assignment of authorship occasionally leads to charges of academic misconduct and sanctions for the violator. A 2002 survey of a large sample of researchers who had received funding from the U.S. National Institutes of Health revealed that 10% of respondents claimed to have inappropriately assigned authorship credit within the last three years. This was the first large scale survey concerning such issues. In other fields only limited or no empirical data is available.

=== Authorship in the natural sciences ===
The natural sciences have no universal standard for authorship, but some major multi-disciplinary journals and institutions have established guidelines for work that they publish. The journal Proceedings of the National Academy of Sciences of the United States of America (PNAS) has an editorial policy that specifies "authorship should be limited to those who have contributed substantially to the work" and furthermore, "authors are strongly encouraged to indicate their specific contributions" as a footnote. The American Chemical Society further specifies that authors are those who also "share responsibility and accountability for the results" and the U.S. National Academies specify "an author who is willing to take credit for a paper must also bear responsibility for its contents. Thus, unless a footnote or the text of the paper explicitly assigns responsibility for different parts of the paper to different authors, the authors whose names appear on a paper must share responsibility for all of it."

=== Authorship in mathematics ===
In mathematics, the authors are usually listed in alphabetical order (the so-called Hardy-Littlewood Rule).

=== Authorship in medicine ===
The medical field defines authorship very narrowly. According to the Uniform Requirements for Manuscripts Submitted to Biomedical Journals, designation as an author must satisfy four conditions. The author must have:

1. Contributed substantially to the conception and design of the study, the acquisition of data, or the analysis and interpretation
2. Drafted or provided critical revision of the article
3. Provided final approval of the version to publish
4. Agreed to be accountable for all aspects of the work in ensuring that questions related to the accuracy or integrity of any part of the work are appropriately investigated and resolved

Acquisition of funding, or general supervision of the research group alone does not constitute authorship. Biomedical authorship is prone to various misconducts and disputes. Many authors – especially those in the middle of the byline – do not fulfill these authorship criteria. Some medical journals have abandoned the strict notion of author, with the flexible notion of contributor.

=== Authorship in the social sciences ===
The American Psychological Association (APA) has similar guidelines as medicine for authorship. The APA acknowledge that authorship is not limited to the writing of manuscripts, but must include those who have made substantial contributions to a study such as "formulating the problem or hypothesis, structuring the experimental design, organizing and conducting the statistical analysis, interpreting the results, or writing a major portion of the paper". While the APA guidelines list many other forms of contributions to a study that do not constitute authorship, it does state that combinations of these and other tasks may justify authorship. Like medicine, the APA considers institutional position, such as department chair, insufficient for attributing authorship.

=== Authorship in the humanities ===
Neither the Modern Languages Association nor the Chicago Manual of Style define requirements for authorship (because usually humanities works are single-authored and the author is responsible for the entire work).

== Growing number of authors per paper ==
From the late 17th century to the 1920s, sole authorship was the norm, and the one-paper-one-author model worked well for distributing credit. Today, shared authorship is common in most academic disciplines, with the exception of the humanities, where sole authorship is still the predominant model. Between about 1980 and 2010 the average number of authors in medical papers increased, and perhaps tripled. One survey found that in mathematics journals over the first decade of the 2000s, "the number of papers with 2, 3 and 4+ authors increased by approximately 50%, 100% and 200%, respectively, while single author papers decreased slightly."

In particular types of research, including particle physics, genome sequencing and clinical trials, a paper's author list can run into the hundreds, referred to as "hyperauthorship". In 1998, the Collider Detector at Fermilab (CDF) adopted a (at that time) highly unorthodox policy for assigning authorship. CDF maintains a standard author list. All scientists and engineers working at CDF are added to the standard author list after one year of full-time work; names stay on the list until one year after the worker leaves CDF. Every publication coming out of CDF uses the entire standard author list, in alphabetical order. Other big collaborations, including most particle physics experiments, followed this model.

In large, multi-center clinical trials authorship is often used as a reward for recruiting patients. A paper published in the New England Journal of Medicine in 1993 reported on a clinical trial conducted in 1,081 hospitals in 15 different countries, involving a total of 41,021 patients. There were 972 authors listed in an appendix and authorship was assigned to a group. In 2015, an article in high-energy physics was published describing the measurement of the mass of the Higgs boson based on collisions in the Large Hadron Collider; the article boasted 5,154 authors, the printed author list needed 24 pages.

Large authors lists have attracted some criticism and are believed to negatively affect all existing ethical issues of authorship. They strain guidelines that insist that each author's role be described and that each author is responsible for the validity of the whole work. Such a system treats authorship more as credit for scientific service at the facility in general rather that as an identification of specific contributions. One commentator wrote, "In more than 25 years working as a scientific editor ... I have not been aware of any valid argument for more than three authors per paper, although I recognize that this may not be true for every field." The rise of shared authorship has been attributed to Big Science—scientific experiments that require collaboration and specialization of many individuals.

Alternatively, the increase in multi-authorship is according to a game-theoretic analysis a consequence of the way scientists are evaluated. Scientists are judged by the number of papers they publish, and by the impact of those papers. Both measures are integrated into the most popular single value measure $h$-index. The $h$-index correlates with winning the Nobel Prize, being accepted for research fellowships and holding positions at top universities. When each author claims each paper and each citation as his/her own, papers and citations are multiplied by the number of authors. Since it is common and rational to cite own papers more than others, a high number of coauthors increases not only the number of own papers, but also their impact. As result, game rules set by $h$-index being a decision criterion for success create a zero-sum $h$-index ranking game, where the rational strategy includes maximizing the number of coauthors up to the majority of the researchers in a field. Data of 189 thousand publications showed that the coauthors' number is strongly correlated with $h$-index. Hence, the system rewards heavily multi-authored papers. This problem is openly acknowledged, and it could easily be "corrected" by dividing each paper and its citations by the number of authors, though this practice has not been widely adopted.

Finally, the rise in shared authorship may also reflect increased acknowledgment of the contributions of lower level workers, including graduate students and technicians, as well as honorary authorship, while allowing for such collaborations to make an independent statement about the quality and integrity of a scientific work.

== Order of authors in a list ==
Rules for the order of multiple authors in a list have historically varied significantly between fields of research. Some fields list authors in order of their degree of involvement in the work, with the most active contributors listed first; other fields, such as mathematics or engineering, sometimes list them alphabetically. Historically, biologists tended to place a principal investigator (supervisor or lab head) last in an author list whereas organic chemists might have put him or her first. Research articles in high energy physics, where the author lists can number in the tens to hundreds, often list authors alphabetically. In the academic fields of economics, business, finance or particle physics, it is also usual to sort the authors alphabetically.

Although listing authors in order of the involvement in the project seems straightforward, it often leads to conflict. A study in the Canadian Medical Association Journal found that more than two-thirds of 919 corresponding authors disagreed with their coauthors regarding contributions of each author.

== Responsibilities of authors ==
Authors' reputations can be damaged if their names appear on a paper that they do not completely understand or with which they were not intimately involved. Numerous guidelines and customs specify that all co-authors must be able to understand and support a paper's major points.

In a notable case, American stem-cell researcher Gerald Schatten had his name listed on a paper co-authored with Hwang Woo-suk. The paper was later exposed as fraudulent and, though Schatten was not accused of participating in the fraud, a panel at his university found that "his failure to more closely oversee research with his name on it does make him guilty of 'research misbehavior.'"

All authors, including co-authors, are usually expected to have made reasonable attempts to check findings submitted for publication. In some cases, co-authors of faked research have been accused of inappropriate behavior or research misconduct for failing to verify reports authored by others or by a commercial sponsor. Examples include the case of Professor Geoffrey Chamberlain named as guest author of papers fabricated by Malcolm Pearce, (Chamberlain was exonerated from collusion in Pearce's deception) and the co-authors of Jan Hendrik Schön at Bell Laboratories. More recent cases include Charles Nemeroff, former editor-in-chief of Neuropsychopharmacology, and the so-called Sheffield Actonel affair.

Additionally, authors are expected to keep all study data for later examination even after publication. Both scientific and academic censure can result from a failure to keep primary data; the case of Ranjit Chandra of Memorial University of Newfoundland provides an example of this. Many scientific journals also require that authors provide information to allow readers to determine whether the authors may have commercial or non-commercial conflicts of interest. Outlined in the author disclosure statement for the American Journal of Human Biology, this is a policy more common in scientific fields where funding often comes from corporate sources. Authors are also commonly required to provide information about ethical aspects of research, particularly where research involves human or animal participants or use of biological material. Provision of incorrect information to journals may be regarded as misconduct. Financial pressures on universities have encouraged this type of misconduct. The majority of recent cases of alleged misconduct involving undisclosed conflicts of interest or failure of the authors to have seen scientific data involve collaborative research between scientists and biotechnology companies.

== Egregious and questionable types of authorship ==
=== Honorary authorship ===
Honorary authorship is sometimes granted to those who played no significant role in the work, for a variety of reasons. Until recently, it was standard to list the head of a German department or institution as an author on a paper regardless of input. The United States National Academy of Sciences, however, warns that such practices "dilute the credit due the people who actually did the work, inflate the credentials of those so 'honored,' and make the proper attribution of credit more difficult." The extent to which honorary authorship still occurs is not empirically known. However, it is plausible to expect that it is still widespread, because senior scientists leading large research groups can receive much of their reputation from a long publication list and thus have little motivation to give up honorary authorships.

A possible measure against honorary authorships has been implemented by some scientific journals, in particular by the Nature journals. They demand that each new manuscript must include a statement of responsibility that specifies the contribution of every author. The level of detail varies between the disciplines. Senior persons may still make some vague claim to have "supervised the project", for example, even if they were only in the formal position of a supervisor without having delivered concrete contributions. (The truth content of such statements is usually not checked by independent persons.) However, the need to describe contributions can at least be expected to somewhat reduce honorary authorships. In addition, it may help to identify the perpetrator in a case of scientific fraud.

=== Gift, guest and rolling authorship ===
More specific types of honorary authorship are gift, guest and rolling authorship. Gift authorship consists of authorship obtained by the offer of another author (honorary or not) with objectives that are beyond the research article itself or are ulterior, as promotion or favor. Researchers found that there are cultural differences in how acceptable people perceive this sort of unmerited gift authorship. For example, graduate students in Denmark said it was less acceptable to add a co-author who did not help with the paper than students in China.

Guest authors are those that are included with the specific objective to increase the probability that it becomes accepted by a journal. A rolling authorship is a special case of gift authorship in which the honor is granted on the basis of previous research papers (published or not) and collaborations within the same research group. The "rolled" author may (or may not) be imposed by a superior employee for reasons that range from the research group's strategic interests, personal career interests, camaraderie or (professional) concession. For instance, a post-doc researcher in the same research group where his PhD was awarded, may be willing to roll his authorship into any subsequent paper from other researchers in that same group, overseeing the criteria for authorship. Per se, this would not cause authorship issues unless the collaboration was imposed by a third party, like a supervisor or department manager, in which case it is called a coercive authorship. Still, omitting the authorship criteria by prioritizing hierarchy arguments, is an unethical practice. This kind of practices may hinder free-thinking and professional independence, and thus should be tackled by research managers, clear research guidelines and authors agreements.

=== Ghost authorship ===
Ghost authorship occurs when an individual makes a substantial contribution to the research or the writing of the report, but is not listed as an author. Researchers, statisticians and writers (e.g. medical writers or technical writers) become ghost authors when they meet authorship criteria but are not named as an author. Writers who work in this capacity are called ghostwriters.

Ghost authorship has been linked to partnerships between industry and higher education. Two-thirds of industry-initiated randomized trials may have evidence of ghost authorship. Ghost authorship is considered problematic because it may be used to obscure the participation of researchers with conflicts of interest.

Litigation against the pharmaceutical company, Merck over health concerns related to use of their drug, Rofecoxib (brand name Vioxx), revealed examples of ghost authorship. Merck routinely paid medical writing companies to prepare journal manuscripts, and subsequently recruited external, academically affiliated researchers to pose as the authors.

Authors are sometimes included in a list without their permission. Even if this is done with the benign intention to acknowledge some contributions, it is problematic since authors carry responsibility for correctness and thus need to have the opportunity to check the manuscript and possibly demand changes.

=== Fraudulent paid-for authorship ===
Researchers can pay to intentionally and dishonestly list themselves as authors on papers they have not contributed to, usually by using an academic paper mill which specializes in authorship sales.

== Unconventional types of authorship ==
=== Anonymous and unclaimed authorship ===
Authors occasionally forgo claiming authorship, for a number of reasons. Historically some authors have published anonymously to shield themselves when presenting controversial claims. A key example is Robert Chambers' anonymous publication of Vestiges of the Natural History of Creation, a speculative, pre-Darwinian work on the origins of life and the cosmos. The book argued for an evolutionary view of life in the same spirit as the late Frenchman Jean-Baptiste Lamarck. Lamarck had long been discredited among intellectuals by this time and evolutionary (or development) theories were exceedingly unpopular, except among the political radicals, materialists, and atheists – Chambers hoped to avoid Lamarck's fate.

In the 18th century, Émilie du Châtelet began her career as a scientific author by submitting a paper in an annual competition held by the French Academy of Sciences; papers in this competition were submitted anonymously. Initially presenting her work without claiming authorship allowed her to have her work judged by established scientists while avoiding the bias against women in the sciences. She did not win the competition, but eventually her paper was published alongside the winning submissions, under her real name.

Scientists and engineers working in corporate and military organizations are often restricted from publishing and claiming authorship of their work because their results are considered secret property of the organization that employs them. One notable example is that of William Sealy Gosset, who was forced to publish his work in statistics under the pseudonym "Student" due to his employment at the Guinness brewery. Another account describes the frustration of physicists working in nuclear weapons programs at the Lawrence Livermore Laboratory – years after making a discovery they would read of the same phenomenon being "discovered" by a physicist unaware of the original, secret discovery of the phenomenon.

Satoshi Nakamoto is a pseudonym of a still unknown author or authors' group behind a white paper about bitcoin.

=== Group authorship ===
Group authorship, also known as corporate, team, or consortium authorship, involves listing a collective entity (e.g., team, project, corporation, or consortium) as the author in the byline. While group authorships can reduce conflicts over authorship order and the criteria for including or excluding individuals, they also presents challenges, such as ethical concerns over credit and responsibility, legal issues related to copyright, and technical difficulties due to the absence of persistent identifiers such as ORCID for groups.

=== Equal co-authorship ===
Equal co-authorship refers to crediting multiple authors as having made "equal contributions" to a paper, often as co-first or co-corresponding authors. This practice has become more common in recent years. Despite its rise, equal co-authorship presents ethical and practical challenges. For instance, it can be difficult to assess whether contributions were truly equal, and tensions might arise about whose name should appear first (the sequence of equal authors). Some argue that equal co-authorship helps resolve tensions and offers fair recognition of significant contributions, especially in collaborative projects. However, even in truly equal scenarios, one author often becomes more prominent, leading to additional complexities about authorship order and responsibilities. The inconsistent recognition of equal co-authorship by journals and academic institutions, along with the lack of standardized policies, further complicates its evaluation in tenure, promotion, and funding decisions.

=== Non-human authorship ===
There have been some cases of non-human animals being credited as authors on academic papers. One of the most famous cases may be that of FDC Willard, a co-author of an influential paper on atomic behavior who happened to be the pet cat of the main author, Jack Hetherington. This paper has been cited over 100 times as of 2025. In these cases, the animal author would not have a legitimate claim to authorship, given that they cannot take responsibility for the content of the paper and consent to its submission.

Artificial intelligence systems have been credited with authorship on a handful of academic publications, however, many publishers disallow this on the grounds that "they cannot take responsibility for the content and integrity of scientific papers". Instead, most academic journals require authors to disclose use of AI assistance in the acknowledgements or a special section of the paper.

== See also ==
- Academic writing
- Conflicts of interest in academic publishing
- Lead author
- Nicolas Bourbaki
- Scholarly communication
- Scientific writing
