= Evidence-Informed Policy Network =

Evidence Informed Policy Network (EVIPNet) is a network, sponsored by the World Health Organization (WHO), which attempts to improve public health, especially in developing countries, by coordinating the efforts of policymakers and health researchers.

== History ==
EVIPNet grew out of discussions at the Ministerial Summit on Health Research held in Mexico City, November 16–20, 2004. Following the Summit, the World Health Assembly which governs the World Health Organization passed Resolution 58.2, 4-5 endorsing the "Mexico Statement On Health Research: Knowledge for better health" developed during the Summit. In the statement, Ministers of Health and delegates called "for national governments to establish sustainable programs to support evidence-based public health and health care delivery systems, and evidence-based health related policies." Resolution 58.34 made a call "to establish or strengthen mechanisms to transfer knowledge in support of evidence-based public health and health-care delivery systems, and evidence-based health-related policies". Developments relevant to EVIPNet are regularly reported to the Advisory Committee on Health Research of the World Health Organization and of its Regional Offices.

In March 2009 the EVIPNet Secretariat presented to WHO's Advisory Committee on Health Research a capacity building strategy that assessed through a validated tool the knowledge needs with respect to a defined set of skills for EVIPNet teams, allowing a strategic and organized approach to capacity building. Similarly, WHO Regional Advisory Committees on Health Research monitor progress and provide key guidance to EVIPNet efforts.

EVIPNet gained great momentum in Africa where policy briefs soon became available. The enthusiasm had spread also to the Americas and the Eastern Mediterranean, and after a coordination meeting organized by WHO in Addis Ababa in October 2015, it gained traction in the European region as well. By then, the Global Steering Group, working with WHO Collaborating Centers (e.g. WHO Collaborating Centre for Evidence-Informed Policy, at McMaster University) and specialized centers such as BIREME, the Latin American and Caribbean Center on Health Sciences Information, had set up one-stop shops that enabled access to specialized collections of indexed policy briefs, systematic reviews, policy documents and other relevant resources, as one of the shared resources for the global EVIPNet networks, such as the free access portals (with registration) of Health Systems Evidence and Health Evidence.

In October 2016 The World Health Organization published an executive summary and document entitled "Evipnet 10 years 10 stories" with a selection of cases describing impacts of EVIPNet at country level.

In the meanwhile, the platform expanded especially in the European region.

In November-December 2016, PAHO's 46th Advisory Committee on Health Research convened and its report, issued in 2017, provided updates on EVIPNet and knowledge translation efforts in the Americas. The meeting was informed by a preliminary version of a Report on Strengthening Research Capacities in the Caribbean that described EVIPNet related technical cooperation in that region.

In July 2018 The BMJ published a special series on the policy on research for health of the Pan American Health Organization (that applies to the Secretariat and Member States) featuring EVIPNet in the article on "Advancing public health and health systems through evidence-informed policy in the Americas".

== Operation ==
EVIPNet operated by forming country or regional-level teams composed of policy makers, researchers and representatives from other sectors (e.g. science & technology, education, civil society organizations, patient advocates, topic experts, local networks, etc.). These teams identify and address country priority topics where a perceived need to strengthen the systematic use of research evidence to inform decisions about policies for health has been identified. EVIPNet therefore includes components relevant to research and development and claims to help strengthen national health research systems.

By providing a common purpose to team members EVIPNet facilitates that different sectors jointly address specific priorities and develop and use specific skills to assess research evidence and integrate it into policies. Frequent outputs of EVIPNet teams are policy briefs that integrate evidence with context and values on succinct and helpful documents that inform decisions by high level decision makers. Several EVIPNet teams have already delivered useful relevant outputs such as Policy Briefs and deliberative dialogues that have informed policy at national and local levels.

To join EVIPNet country health authorities establish a formal commitment with the Secretariat and develop a work proposal. The Secretariat of EVIPNet is composed by staff from the research policy teams of the World Health Organization (WHO) in Geneva and its Regional Offices. The EVIPNet Secretariat supports country teams so that they produce robust proposals. EVIPNet has Steering Groups (in the regional and global network) and resource groups in each region. These groups work with experts and networks to provide feedback and expertise to the country teams.

The Secretariat works with country teams to identify and address skill needs and deliver targeted capacity building activities in collaboration with networks and partners (e.g. SUPPORT Collaboration, McMaster Health Forum, Cochrane Collaboration, etc.)

== Reception and impact ==
As EVIPNet expands and develops it has been highlighted as a worthy approach featured in prominent strategy documents addressing development and capacity building for research for health. It remains relevant as reflected in the call to action issued at the Global Ministerial Forum on Research for Health in Bamako in November 2008 by ministers and ministerial representatives from 53 countries. EVIPNet was also featured in at least 12 different presentations at the First Global Symposium on Health Systems Research (Montreux, Switzerland, 2010), and is frequently featured at Colloquiums of the Cochrane and Campbell Collaborations, and Global Forums on Health Research (e.g. Bamako 2008, Havana 2009).

EVIPNet has also allowed for the development of customized resources that have helped advance their work and knowledge about health systems research. For example, the SUPPORT Tools for Evidence Informed Policy Making (available in various languages), the Evidence Portal, or the McMaster Database on Health Systems Evidence with >1800 systematic reviews on health systems evidence.

== PAHO/WHO technical programs ==
EVIPNet has also become a tool for PAHO/WHO technical programs offering an integrated approach to technical cooperation; in PAHO/WHO research focal points in country offices are part of EVIPNet teams, and technical programs have adopted EVIPNet methods to provide an integrated technical cooperation.
