= Academic age =

The academic age is the time that a scientist has been in the research field and performed active research. The academic age of a scientist may be computed as the span of years from their first published work up until the present. Another definition regards the academic age as the time since their doctoral degree.

When the academic age is computed in formal settings, the academic age may be adjusted taking into account maternity and paternity leave, long-term illness, clinical training and/or national service.

The academic age may be used as one of the components in scientometrics studies, particularly author-level metrics.

The academic age may be a strict criterion for certain grant applications. For instance, the European Research Council has several funding schemes restricted to specific academic ages: So-called Starting Grants require an academic age of 2 to 7 years, Consolidator grants require an academic age of 7 to 12 years and Advanced Grants require "a track-record of significant research achievements in the last 10 years".

== See also ==
- Author-level metrics
- Scientometrics
