= Jennifer Kurinczuk =

British physician

Jennifer J. Kurinczuk
- Education: University of Leicester
- Scientific career
- Workplaces: University of Oxford; London School of Hygiene & Tropical Medicine; University of Leicester; Telethon Kids Institute

Jennifer J. Kurinczuk is a British physician who is a Professor of Perinatal Epidemiology and Director of the National Perinatal Epidemiology Unit at the University of Oxford. In 2019 she was named an Honorary Fellow of the Royal College of Obstetricians and Gynaecologists. During the COVID-19 pandemic, Kurinczuk investigated the neonatal complications of coronavirus disease.

== Early life and education ==
Kurinczuk wanted to be a doctor as a child. She eventually studied medicine at the University of Leicester and graduated in 1985. During her undergraduate degree, Kurinczuk enjoyed her courses in epidemiology. She worked as a junior hospital doctor. She was awarded a Wellcome Trust research fellowship to train in epidemiology at the London School of Hygiene & Tropical Medicine, where she worked toward a doctoral degree. Kurinczuk returned to the University of Leicester, where she worked in public health.

== Research and career ==
In 1992 Kurinczuk moved to Australia, where she joined the recently formed Telethon Kids Institute and worked as a perinatal epidemiologist. After seven years in Australia, Kurinczuk returned to the United Kingdom, where she was made Senior Lecturer at the University of Leicester. At Leicester established a Master's course in epidemiology. She was awarded a National Health Service (NHS) Career Scientist fellowship, and in 2003 took her funding to the National Perinatal Epidemiology Unit at the University of Oxford. In 2008 Kurinczuk was made Deputy Director, and in 2011 Director of the National Perinatal Epidemiology Unit. Her research considers the physical and mental health of mothers and babies, and how research can be used to inform policy.

In particular, Kurinczuk studies the origins and consequences of neonatal encephalopathy, a neurological disorder that occurs in the earliest days of life. She led the Congenital Anomaly Register (CAR) for Oxfordshire, Berkshire and Buckinghamshire (OBB), a portal that collected information on babies born with congenital abnormalities. The information was used to better understand the causes of these abnormalities, to improve the quality of testing facilities and to enhance NHS services.

She studied the health risks associated with women who have had Caesarean sections having subsequent natural births, and showed that it was safer for women to have another Caesarean. She led Mothers and Babies: Reducing Risk through Audits and Confidential Enquiries across the UK (MBRRACE-UK), a programme which monitored maternal deaths between 2009 and 2013. In 2015 MBRRACE-UK) showed that whilst maternal deaths were falling, women could receive better care, and suicides could be prevented. She was named an Honorary Fellow of the Royal College of Obstetricians and Gynaecologists in 2019.

During the COVID-19 pandemic, Kurinczuk investigated the neonatal complications of coronavirus disease. She studied the incidence of neonatal coronavirus disease, as well as its clinical presentation and treatment options. Kurinczuk and Marian Knight studied the risks associated with being pregnant during the SARS-CoV-2 outbreak. She analysed the outcomes of over 400 pregnant women admitted to all of the hospitals in the United Kingdom with a maternity unit during a five-week period. Her study demonstrated that pregnant women were not more likely than non-pregnant women to contract severe forms of coronavirus disease. She demonstrated that black and minority ethnic pregnant women were more likely than white women to be hospitalised with coronavirus disease.

Kurinczuk and the National Perinatal Epidemiology Unit were awarded an Athena SWAN silver award for their work on gender equality.

== Selected publications ==
- Hansen, Michèle; Kurinczuk, Jennifer J.; Bower, Carol; Webb, Sandra (2002-03-07). "The Risk of Major Birth Defects after Intracytoplasmic Sperm Injection and in Vitro Fertilization". New England Journal of Medicine. 346 (10): 725–730. doi:10.1056/NEJMoa010035. hdl:2381/35985. ISSN 0028-4793. PMID 11882727.
- Kurinczuk, Jennifer J.; White-Koning, Melanie; Badawi, Nadia (2010-06-01). "Epidemiology of neonatal encephalopathy and hypoxic–ischaemic encephalopathy". Early Human Development. 86 (6): 329–338. doi:10.1016/j.earlhumdev.2010.05.010. ISSN 0378-3782. PMID 20554402.
- Hansen, Michèle; Bower, Carol; Milne, Elizabeth; de Klerk, Nicholas; J. Kurinczuk, Jennifer (2005-02-01). "Assisted reproductive technologies and the risk of birth defects—a systematic review". Human Reproduction. 20 (2): 328–338. doi:10.1093/humrep/deh593. ISSN 0268-1161. PMID 15567881.
