= Ijad Madisch =

German virologist (born 1980)

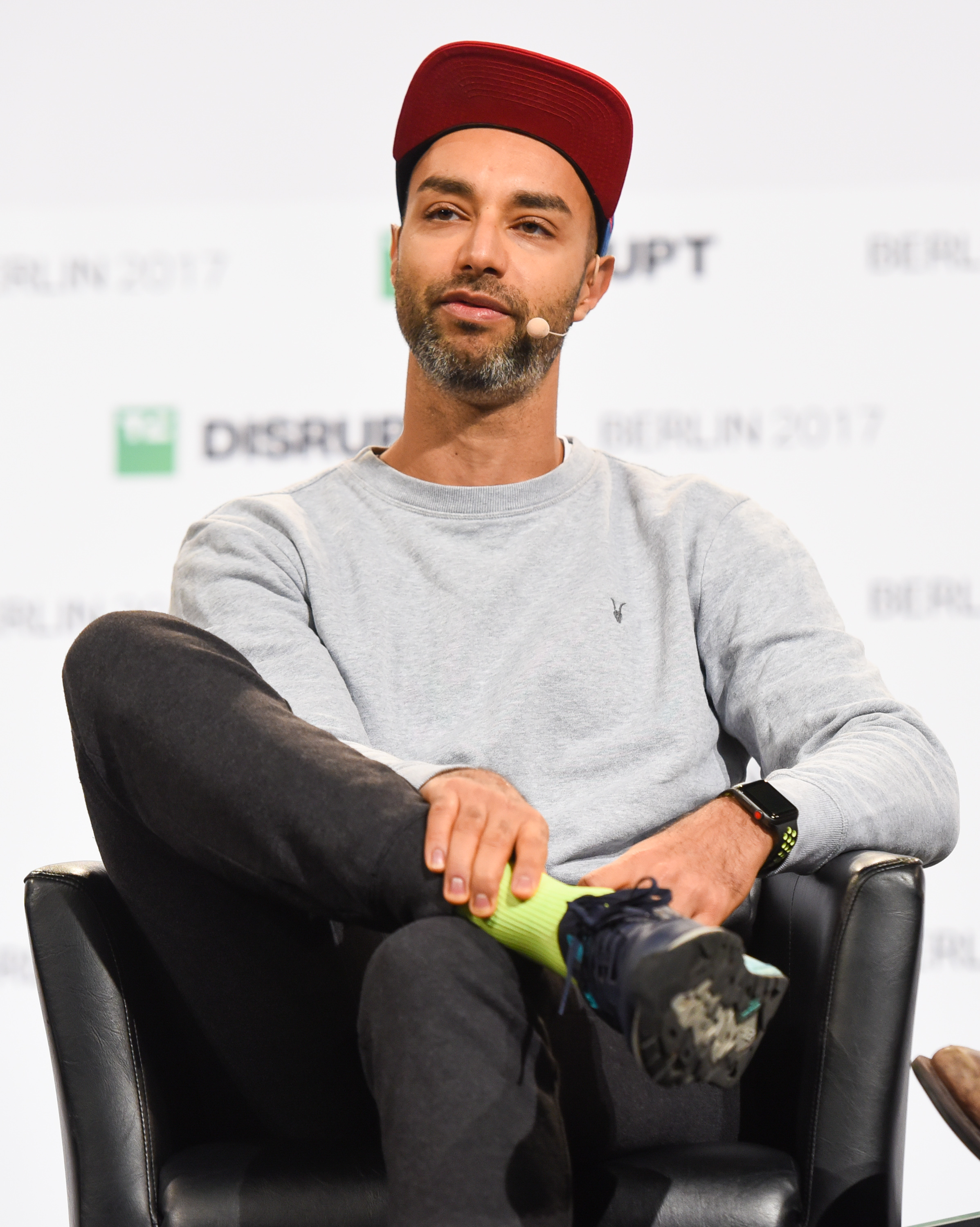
- Ijad Madisch speaks onstage at TechCrunch Disrupt Berlin in 2017
- Born: 7 October 1980 (age 45)
- Occupations: Virologist and entrepreneur
- Scientific career
- Thesis: (2007)
- Doctoral advisor: Albert Heim

Ijad Madisch (born 7 October 1980 in Wolfsburg, Germany) is a German virologist, founder and CEO of the social research network ResearchGate and was a member of the Digital Council (Digitalrat) of the Cabinet of Germany (Bundesregierung).

== Personal life ==
Ijad Madisch was born in Wolfsburg to a Syrian family who immigrated to Germany. His elder brother is Ahmed Madisch, a professor and chief physician at Siloah hospital in Hannover. In 2000, Ijad got his Abitur from Ernestinum Celle Gymnasium in Celle.

Ijad Madisch plays beach volleyball semi-professionally. His current teammate is the former German national player Finn Dittelbach.

== Career ==
From 2000 to 2007, Ijad Madisch studied medicine at the Hannover Medical School (MHH) and worked in the US at the Massachusetts General Hospital, Boston, Harvard Medical School. From 2002 to 2008, he studied computer sciences at the University of Hagen, but did not complete this degree.

In 2007, Madisch received his doctorate from the MHH in the field of virology with summa cum laude for his work entitled "Molecular Phylogeny and Bioinformatic Analysis as the basis for the typing of human adenoviruses and for the design of organ-specific gene therapy adenoviral vectors". He received the doctoral prize from MHH for this thesis.

From 2008 to 2010, he went back to Massachusetts General Hospital as a postdoctoral researcher. During this time, Madisch won the Young Investigator Prize of the Radiological Society of North America (RSNA) in Chicago for the project "High-resolution volume CT imaging of tissue-engineered bone growth: correlation between imaging, bio-mechanical strength, and protein transcription analysis".

The decisive factor for his move to the United States was the desire to found ResearchGate, the social network which is specifically created for scientists to exchange their research projects and results. Since 2010, he is the head of the digital platform as chief executive officer (CEO) and has raised 87.6M $ from Bill Gates, Benchmark (venture capital firm), Founders Fund, Goldman Sachs, Ashton Kutcher and others.

Time Magazine named Ijad Madisch a Next Generation Leader.

He also is a member of the selection committee for the Breakthrough Prize Junior Challenge founded by Sergey Brin, Priscilla Chan and Mark Zuckerberg, Yuri Milner and Julia Milner, and Anne Wojcicki.

After a telephone request from the German Chancellor Angela Merkel, Ijad Madisch became on 22 August 2018 a member of the 10-member Digital Council of the Cabinet of Germany.

== Publications ==
- Ijad Madisch, Gabi Harste, Heidi Pommer, Albert Heim: Phylogenetic analysis of the main neutralization and hemagglutination determinants of all human adenovirus prototypes as a basis for molecular classification and taxonomy. (J Virol. 2005 Dezember;79(24):15265-76.), online
- Ijad Madisch, Roman Wölfel, Gabi Harste, Heidi Pommer, Albert Heim: Molecular identification of adenovirus sequences: A rapid scheme for early typing of human adenoviruses in diagnostic samples of immunocompetent and immunodeficient patients (J Med Virol. 2006 Sep;78(9):1210-7. doi: 10.1002/jmv.20683. online
- Ijad Madisch, Soeren Hofmayer, Christian Moritz, Alexander Grintzalis, Jens Hainmueller, Patricia Pring-Akerblom, Albert Heim: Phylogenetic analysis and structural predictions of human adenovirus penton proteins as a basis for tissue-specific adenovirus vector design (J Virol 2007 Aug;81(15):8270-81. doi: 10.1128/JVI.00048-07. Epub 2007 May 23. online
- Soeren Hofmayer, Ijad Madisch, Sebastian Darr, Fabienne Rehren, Albert Heim: Unique sequence features of the Human Adenovirus 31 complete genomic sequence are conserved in clinical isolates (BMC genomics, Vol. 10, 25. November 2009, Nr. 1, date:12.2009: 1–14), SpringerLink, 2009; online
- Christian Weinand, Irina Pomerantseva, Craig M Neville, Rajiv Gupta, Eli Weinberg, Ijad Madisch, Frederic Shapiro, Harutsugi Abukawa, Maria J Troulis, Joseph P Vacanti: Hydrogel-beta-TCP scaffolds and stem cells for tissue engineering bone (Bone. 2006 Apr;38(4):555-63. doi: 10.1016/j.bone.2005.10.016. Epub 2005 Dec 20.)
