= National Perinatal Epidemiology Unit =

English-based research unit

The National Perinatal Epidemiology Unit (NPEU) is a multi-disciplinary research unit within the Nuffield Department of Women's and Reproductive Health at Oxford University. It is located in the Richard Doll Building on the Old Road Campus, in Headington, east Oxford, England.

The unit's work involves randomized controlled trials, national surveillance programs and surveys and other research on maternal and infant health and care in the perinatal period (before, during and after birth). The early work of the NPEU in developing a register of perinatal trials and methods for synthesizing their results lay the foundations for the Cochrane Collaboration.

== Activities ==
The mission of the NPEU is "...to produce methodologically rigorous research evidence to improve the care provided to women and their families during pregnancy, childbirth, the newborn period and early childhood as well as promoting the effective use of resources by perinatal health services.” Since its inception, a key area of its activities has been undertaking and supporting randomized controlled trials of the effects of perinatal care, now through the NPEU Clinical Trials Unit.

The NPEU runs the UK Obstetric Surveillance System (UKOSS), which is a national system studying rare disorders of pregnancy. In 2011, the Policy Research Unit in Maternal Health and Care (PRUMC) was established at the NPEU.

== History ==
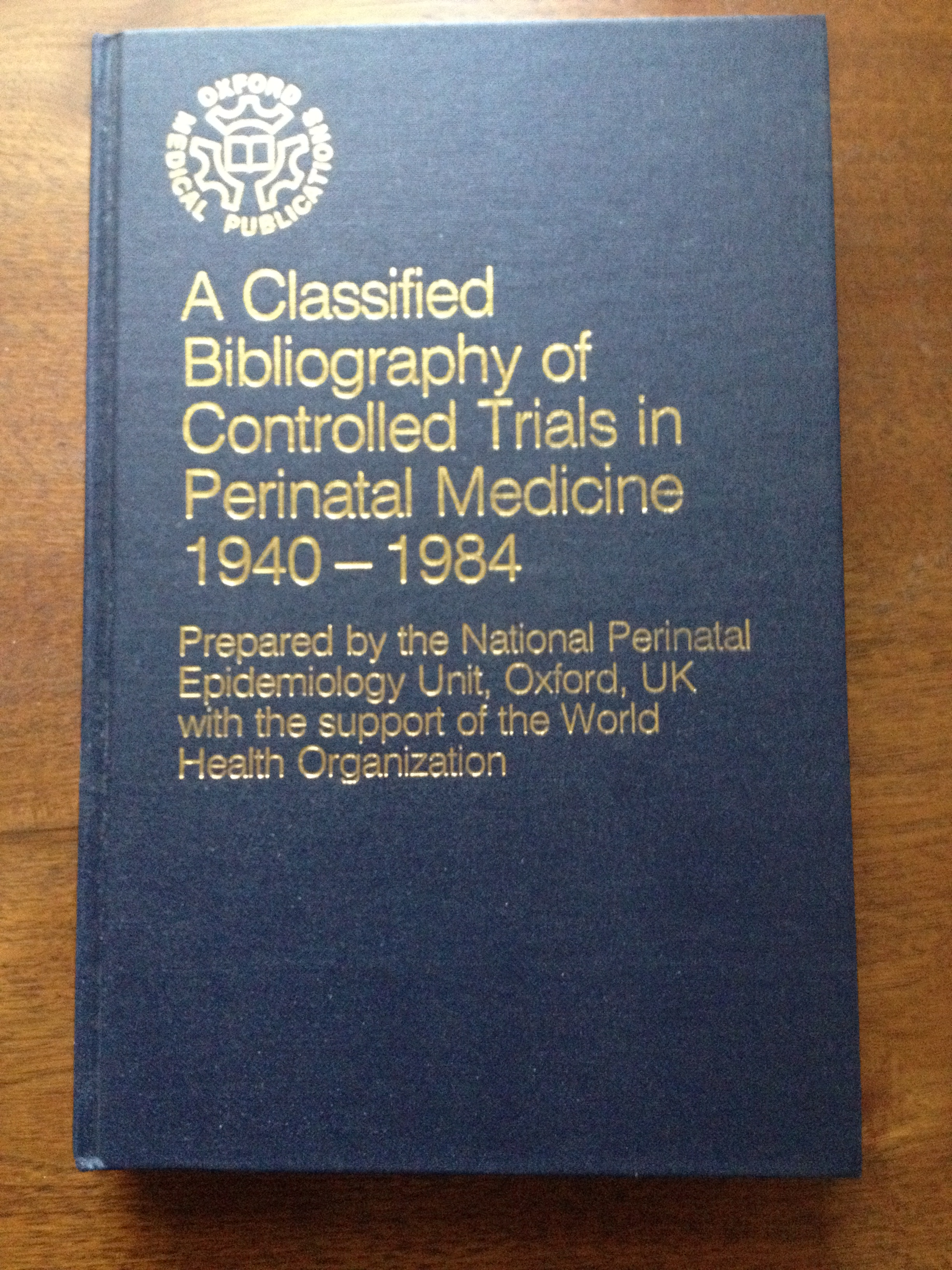
The NPEU's Classified Bibliography of Controlled Trials in Perinatal Medicine 1940–1984

The NPEU was established in 1978 by the Department of Health at Oxford University, following a joint request for a national research institute by the Royal College of Obstetricians and Gynaecologists and the British Paediatric Association. The Department gave the unit the task of providing "information which can promote effective use of resources in the perinatal health services." From the beginning, the first NPEU Director, Iain Chalmers, was guided by the principles for evaluating effectiveness of health care described by Archie Cochrane in his book, Effectiveness and Efficiency: Random Reflections on Health Services.

From its early days, the NPEU was a leader in both randomized controlled trials to assess the effects of perinatal care, the retrieval of information, and the development and use of systematic reviews and meta-analyses to synthesize research results. The unit developed extensive national and international collaborations which were to form both the basis of its work and lay the foundations for the development of the Cochrane Collaboration.

Beginning with a card file of references to perinatal trials and both manual and electronic searching for further trials, the NPEU developed first a book, the Classified Bibliography of Controlled Trials in Perinatal Medicine 1940–1984, and then the Oxford Database of Perinatal Trials (ODPT). This process of developing a register of trials led to others establishing a register of trials in fertility as well as the basis for the development of the Cochrane Controlled Trials Register (CCTR) when the NPEU's Director left to establish the UK Cochrane Centre in 1992, from where the Cochrane Collaboration evolved in 1993. By 1989, the synthesis of the results of perinatal research led to the publication of major books. By 1990, ODPT included electronic syntheses called overviews, which were the precursor for the Cochrane Collaboration's Cochrane Database of Systematic Reviews.

In 2013, the NPEU was awarded a silver department Athena SWAN award for its commitment to advancing women's careers in science and medicine.

In February 2026, the unit moved from the University's Nuffield Department of Population Health, of which it was previously a part, to the Nuffield Department of Women’s and Reproductive Health.

== Directors ==
- Sir Iain Chalmers (1978 to 1992)
- Judith Lumley (1994 to 1995)
- Peter Brocklehurst (2002 to 2011)
- Jenny Kurinczuk (2011 to 2023)
- Marian Knight (present)
