= Marian Knight =

British physician

Marian Knight MBE
- Education: University of Oxford
- Scientific career
- Workplaces: Public Health England; University of Oxford
- Thesis: Syncytiotrophoblast microvillous membrane deportation in the pathogenesis of pre-eclampsia (1997)

Marian Knight MBE is a British physician who is a Professor of Maternal and Child Population Health at the University of Oxford. She is an Honorary Consultant of Public Health for Public Health England. During the COVID-19 pandemic Knight studied the characteristics and outcomes of pregnant women who tested positive for COVID-19.

== Early life and education ==
As a child, Knight was not sure whether she should study mathematics or medicine. She eventually settled on medicine, and completed her first degree in medical sciences at the University of Cambridge. She specialised in obstetrics and neonatalogy, and worked in Edinburgh, Newcastle upon Tyne and Oxford. Knight returned to academia, and completed a doctoral degree at the University of Oxford. Her research considered the pathogenesis of pre-eclampsia. In 2005 Knight established the UK Obstetric Surveillance System, a national system to study rare disorders of pregnancy. She specialised in epidemiology and joined the faculty at the University of Oxford in 2006.

== Research and career ==
In February 2012 Knight was one of the first academics to secure an National Institute for Health Research Professorship, with which she studied maternal morbidity and best practise to care for infants who require early surgery. In 2015 Knight and Jennifer Kurinczuk led The Confidential Enquiry into Maternal Deaths, a study into perinatal mental health, and showed that almost half of perinatal suicides could be avoided by providing better standards of care. Of all the maternal suicides between 2009 and 2013, Knight showed that only 15% had contact with perinatal mental health services, despite over half of the women having suffered from depression before taking their own lives. Knight and Kurinczuk argued that basic checks of maternal health would save lives.

Knight investigated the effectiveness of antibiotic prophylaxis to prevent maternal infection following operative vaginal delivery in a randomised controlled trial of 27 obstetric units. She showed that women who received a single dose of an antibiotic prophylaxis 3 hours after operative vaginal delivery were considerably less likely to suffer from maternal infection.

During the COVID-19 pandemic Knight studied the characteristics and medical outcomes of pregnant women who tested positive for severe acute respiratory syndrome coronavirus 2 (SARS-CoV-2). Knight identified that pregnant women were at no greater risk for severe forms of SARS-CoV-2 than non-pregnant women. She found that most pregnant women who tested positive for SARS-CoV-2 were in their third trimester, and that transmission to children was uncommon (5% of the 265 infants tested). Knight collected data from all the United Kingdom's 194 obstetric units, and showed that 56% of the women admitted to hospital with COVID-19 were from Black or ethnic minority groups. In 'normal times', only 20% of women giving birth are from Black and minority ethnic backgrounds. Knight said that research into the origins of this disparity was "urgently needed".

Knight was appointed Member of the Order of the British Empire (MBE) in the 2023 New Year Honours for services to maternal and public health. She was elected a Fellow of the Academy of Medical Sciences in 2021.

== Selected publications ==
- Knight, M. (2007). "Peripartum hysterectomy in the UK: management and outcomes of the associated haemorrhage". BJOG: An International Journal of Obstetrics & Gynaecology. 114 (11): 1380–1387. doi:10.1111/j.1471-0528.2007.01507.x. ISSN 1471-0528. PMID 17877772. S2CID 72439321.
- Knight, Marian; Callaghan, William M.; Berg, Cynthia; Alexander, Sophie; Bouvier-Colle, Marie-Helene; Ford, Jane B.; Joseph, KS; Lewis, Gwyneth; Liston, Robert M.; Roberts, Christine L.; Oats, Jeremy (2009-11-27). "Trends in postpartum hemorrhage in high resource countries: a review and recommendations from the International Postpartum Hemorrhage Collaborative Group". BMC Pregnancy and Childbirth. 9 (1): 55. doi:10.1186/1471-2393-9-55. ISSN 1471-2393. PMC 2790440. PMID 19943928.
- Knight, Marian (2014). "Saving Lives, Improving Mothers' Care Lessons learned to inform future maternity care from the UK and Ireland Confidential Enquiries into Maternal Deaths and Morbidity 2009-2012". Mbrrace-–Uk.
