= Australian Family Physician =

- Discipline: Family medicine
- Language: English

Publication details
- Former name: Annals of General Practice
- History: 1956–present
- Publisher: Royal Australian College of General Practitioners (Australia)
- Frequency: Monthly
- Impact factor: 0.759 (2015)

Standard abbreviations
- ISO 4: Aust. Fam. Physician

Indexing
- ISSN: 0300-8495
- OCLC no.: 608167033

Links
- Journal homepage

The Australian Family Physician is a monthly peer-reviewed medical journal published by the Royal Australian College of General Practitioners. It was established in 1956 as the Annals of General Practice, obtaining its current name in 1971. The journal is abstracted and indexed in Index Medicus/MEDLINE/PubMed and the Science Citation Index Expanded. According to the Journal Citation Reports, the journal has a 2015 impact factor of 0.759.
