= Melinda Mills =

Canadian and Dutch sociologist

Melinda Mills MBE FBA
- Born: 1969 (age 56–57); Red Deer, Alberta
- Education: University of Alberta, University of Groningen
- Organization(s): University of Oxford, Nuffield College
- Website: www.melindamills.com

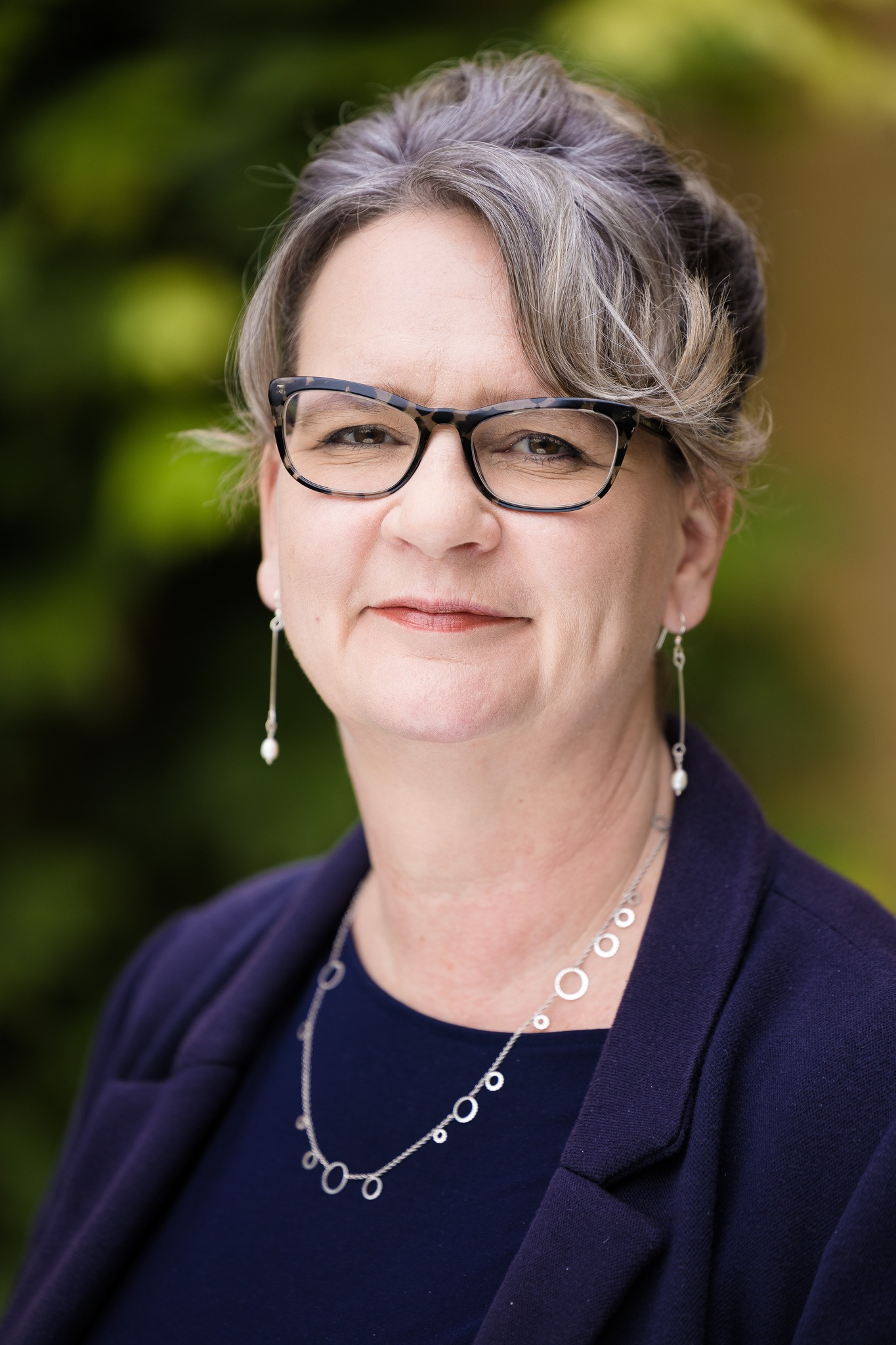
Headshot of Professor Melinda Mills.

Melinda Mills, MBE, FBA (born 1969) is a professor of Demography and Population Health at the University of Oxford and Nuffield College where she is Director of the Leverhulme Centre for Demographic Science and Demographic Science Unit. She also holds a part-time position as Professor of Data Science and Public Health Policy, Department of Econometrics, Economics and Finance, University of Groningen, The Netherlands.

She has been one of three Special Advisors to the European Commissioner of the Economy, is a Trustee of the UK Biobank, on the Scientific and Ethics Advisory Boards of Our Future Health UK and Data and Management Committee of the Health and Retirement Survey US.

A leading expert in demographic science, she has published more than 120 articles in prominent science and interdisciplinary journals and books including two applied statistical textbooks in survival analysis and applied quantitative statistical genetics. Mills’ scientific work spans a range of interdisciplinary topics at the intersection of demography and population, molecular genetics and applied statistics. Her substantive research specializes in demography, fertility and human reproductive behaviour, public health policy, emergency response, life course and inequality.

== Early life and education ==
Mills was born in Red Deer, Alberta Canada and attended River Glen Elementary and Lindsay Thurber Comprehensive High School. She studied sociology and demography at the University of Alberta, where she obtained an undergraduate BA and an MA (specialization demography). She received her PhD in demography (2000) from the University of Groningen in the Netherlands.

== Career ==
Mills has held various scientific positions. Mills worked at the University of Groningen and Vrije Universiteit Amsterdam in the Netherlands and Bielefeld Universität in Germany. Since 2014, she joined the University of Oxford and Nuffield College. Mills was the first female Professor and first female Head of the Department of Sociology at the University of Oxford from 2015 to 2018. She established the Leverhulme Centre for Demographic Science at the University of Oxford and Nuffield College in 2019. In 2023 she formed the Demographic Science Unit as Professor of Demography and Population Health at the Nuffield Department of Population Health, University of Oxford.

She has written extensively in several areas, including fertility and low fertility, with a focus on socioeconomic and structural factors, policy incentives and childlessness. Mills has held multiple prestigious grants including an ERC Consolidator Grant (SOCIOGENOME) and an ERC Advanced Grant (CHRONO). Her work has also examined biological and genetic factors related to timing and number of children, with her team leading the first Genome-Wide Association Study (GWAS) of age of first birth and number of children ever born. Work has also linked reproductive with externalizing behavior, with ancient genome data, lack of diversity in genomic discoveries and scientometrics, genetics of chronotypes and night shift work, and importance of family-based models in genetics.

Mills has also conducted research in public health policy, emergency and pandemic responses, including life expectancy losses, social networks, demographic science & fatality rates, COVID-19 certificates, misinformation and social media use, inequality & adherence to NPIs (non-pharmaceutical interventions), geospatial forecasting of hospital demand, gender differences in sleep disruption, and led Royal Society reports on face coverings, vaccine deployment and vaccine passports.

Outside of her scientific work, Mills has held various non-Executive and advisory roles across multiple organizations. In 2017, she received the Ministerial appointment to the UKRI (UK Research and Innovation) ESRC (Economic and Social Research Council). In 2018 she received the Ministerial appointment to serve on the non-Executive Supervisory Board (Raad van Toezicht) for NWO, the Dutch Science Organization. Since 2022, she is one three Special Advisors to the European Commissioner of the Economy, and in 2024 is a Trustee of the UK Biobank, since 2022 on the Scientific and Ethics Advisory Boards of Our Future Health UK and Data and Management Committee of the Health and Retirement Survey US.

Mills was appointed Member of the Most Excellent Order of the British Empire (MBE) in the 2018 Queen's Birthday Honours and in the same year elected as Fellow of the British Academy (FBA).

In 2020 she was awarded the Clifford C. Clogg Award for Mid-Career Achievement from the Population Association of America. In 2022, she we awarded the James W. Vaupel Trailblazer Award from the European Association of Population Studies, for outstanding achievements in methods, mathematical demography and biodemography.
