= Naomi Allen (scientist) =

British epidemiologist and academic

- Education: University of Oxford; London School of Hygiene & Tropical Medicine; University of Southampton
- Scientific career
- Institutions: University of Oxford; UK Biobank
- Thesis: Nutritional and genetic determinants of hormone levels in relation to prostate cancer risk (2000)

Naomi Allen is a British epidemiologist who is a professor at the Nuffield Department of Population Health University of Oxford. She is based in the Clinical Trial Service Unit, and Chief Scientist for UK Biobank. She is interested in the role of diet and obesity in cancer development.

== Early life and education ==
Allen was an environmentalist and campaigned for Greenpeace and Friends of the Earth as a young person. She decided to study environmental science at the University of Southampton, where she became interested in public health and epidemiology through optional modules. She graduated during a recession, and says that she "drifted from one awful job to another". Allen applied for an MSc in epidemiology at the London School of Hygiene & Tropical Medicine. She eventually earned her doctoral degree at the University of Oxford, where she studied the nutritional and genetic determinants of hormone levels and how this impacted prostate cancer risk.

== Research and career ==
Allen studies the role of diet and obesity in cancer diagnoses. She leads a research group studying the relationship between endogenous hormones and nutritional biomarkers in prostate cancer risk.

Allen joined UK Biobank as an epidemiologist in 2011. She was made Chief Scientist in 2019, and led new initiatives including improving follow-up with participants. Genome sequencing enables researchers to investigate genetic variation across the whole genome, which helps researchers understand how variation influences health and disease risk. Allen hopes that the UK Biobank helps researchers do better risk prediction, improving ability to characterise risk of developing conditions such as breast cancer. For examples,BioBank has identified a polygenic risk score for coronary heart disease, revealing that 8% of the UK population have triple a normal heart disease risk. She has trialled wearable technology with BioBank participants, providing 100,000 with smart watches in 2014. This study showed it was possible to identify Parkinson's disease seven years before a typical diagnosis.

Allen also believes it will help identify genetic variants that are associated with a particular health outcome, and provide insight into potential drug candidates. The Broad Institute study that revealed 8% of the UK population had three times the heart disease risk proposed that prevention strategies (e.g. statins or other cardiovascular treatments) could be used from an early age.

== Selected publications ==
- Cathie Sudlow; John Gallacher; Naomi Allen; et al. (March 2015). "UK biobank: an open access resource for identifying the causes of a wide range of complex diseases of middle and old age". PLOS Medicine. 12 (3) e1001779. doi:10.1371/JOURNAL.PMED.1001779. ISSN 1549-1277. PMC 4380465. PMID 25826379.
- Clare Bycroft; Colin Freeman; Desislava Petkova; et al. (October 2018). "The UK Biobank resource with deep phenotyping and genomic data". Nature. 562 (7726): 203–209. doi:10.1038/S41586-018-0579-Z. ISSN 1476-4687. PMC 6786975. PMID 30305743.
- Gwenaëlle Douaud; Soojin Lee; Fidel Alfaro-Almagro; et al. (April 2022). "SARS-CoV-2 is associated with changes in brain structure in UK Biobank". Nature. 604 (7907): 697–707. Bibcode:2022Natur.604..697D. doi:10.1038/S41586-022-04569-5. ISSN 1476-4687. PMC 9046077. PMID 35255491.
