= Nina Hallowell =

British social scientist (1957–2023)

- Born: 4 November 1957
- Died: 28 June 2023 (aged 65); Edinburgh, Scotland, UK
- Education: University of Stirling (BSc); University of Oxford (DPhil); King's College London (MA)
- Known for: Medical sociology, Genomics, Bioethics, research ethics
- Scientific career
- Workplaces: University of Oxford; Big Data Institute; University of Cambridge; University of Edinburgh; Institute of Cancer Research

Nina Hallowell (4 November 1957 – 28 June 2023) was a medical sociologist and Professor of Social and Ethical Aspects of Genomics at the Nuffield Department of Population Health, University of Oxford, England. Hallowell's research focused on patient's experiences of genetic testing, the sociology of risk, and the sociology of the body.

== Early life and education ==
Nina was born in November 1957. She had an unconventional route into academia which she described as 'tortuous', having dropped out of a HND course in biology and worked in a betting shop for five years before taking her first degree in psychology. She went on to hold degrees across three social science disciplines: psychology, medical ethics and general linguistics, the final being a DPhil at the University of Oxford.

== Career and research ==
Hallowell joined the University of Cambridge in 1994, joining as a research associate in the Centre for Family Research within the Department of Psychology on a project researching families and genetic disorders. Her work focused on risk perception and awareness in the genetic context. During this time her interest in bioethics grew and she served on both the Cambridge Psychology Research Ethics Committee and the local NHS Multicentre Research Ethics Committee.

She later worked as a social scientist, teaching social science and ethics in public health science at the University of Edinburgh Medical School in 2004. In 2008 she was awarded funding at Edinburgh University by the Leverhulme Trust to investigate lay and expert views of cancer genetics.

Hallowell rejoined Oxford University in 2016 where she held the titles of Senior Researcher and Associate Professor. She was later a Fellow of Ethics and Values at Reuben College. Hallowell also co-directed the EPSRC Centre for Doctoral Training in Health Data Science, within the Big Data Institute.

She was appointed a Professor of Social and Ethical Aspects of Genomics at the University of Oxford in November 2020. She delivered her inaugural lecture, introduced by Professor Sir Rory Collins, at the Nuffield Department of Population Health in May 2022, which was titled "Solitary, poor, brutish, and short' (Hobbes, 1651): my career as a contract researcher".

Hallowell was a member of the Biometrics and Forensics Ethics Group, an advisory non-departmental public body sponsored by the Home Office. She undertook this role between 2011 and 2020 and again from 2021 onwards. She chaired the BFEG's Facial Recognition Working Group from 2018 to 2019 which identified key ethical areas to be considered when designing policy and deploying facial recognition technology in police forces. She died on 28 June 2023 aged 65.

== Activism ==
Nina was an advocate for addressing the gender pay gap in society and was an active member of equality campaigns at the University of Oxford in 2018.

== Selected publications ==
- Hallowell, N.; Lawton, J.; Gregory, S. (2004). Reflections on Research – the Realities of Doing Research in the Social Sciences (1st ed.). Open University Press. ISBN 033521309X.

== Read more ==
- Alaszewski, Andy (17 February 2024). "Nina Hallowell, 4th november 1957 – 28th June 2023: a risk researcher who explored the ways in which genetics touches human lives". Health, Risk & Society. 26 (1–2): 93–99. doi:10.1080/13698575.2024.2305875. ISSN 1369-8575.
