= CTSU =

CTSU may refer to:

- Clinical Trial Service Unit at Oxford University
- Cancer Trials Support Unit, a service of the U.S. National Cancer Institute
