= Cornelia van Duijn =

Dutch epidemiologist

Cornelia Marja van Duijn is a Dutch epidemiologist. She is a Professor of Epidemiology at Nuffield Department of Population Health and a Fellow of St Cross College, Oxford. In 2020 she was elected a Fellow of the Academy of Medical Sciences.

== Education ==
Cornelia van Duijn studied for a master of science in human nutrition and mathematical statistics at the Agricultural University of Wageningen, and earned her doctorate in genetics and epidemiology at Erasmus University Medical School in 1992.

== Research ==
She is Professor of Genetic Epidemiology at the Erasmus University Medical School Rotterdam in the Netherlands. She is also Professor of Epidemiology at Nuffield Department of Population Health, and part of the Oxford Big Data Institute. Her research interests are in interactions between genes, and between genes and the environment. van Duijn leads or is part of a number of large epidemiological studies. With Masud Husain, she co-leads Dementia Research Oxford, a consortium aimed at identifying treatments and prevention for dementia. She is also involved in international consortia such as CHARGE (Cohorts for Heart & Aging Research in Genome Epidemiology), IGAP (International Genetics of Alzheimer Disease Project (IGAP) and EADB (European Alzheimer Disease Biobank).

Van Duijn is on the steering committee of the Oxford British Heart Foundation (BHF) Center of Excellence. In November 2024 van Duijn was announced as the new research director of Brain Health, a consortium which aims “to lead a UK-wide data and infrastructure approach dedicated to brain health research”.

In June 2020 she became a Fellow of the Academy of Medical Sciences. She is a member of the Royal Netherlands Academy of Arts and Sciences (KNAW).

== Selected publications ==
- Winblad B; Palmer K; Kivipelto M; et al. (1 September 2004). "Mild cognitive impairment--beyond controversies, towards a consensus: report of the International Working Group on Mild Cognitive Impairment". Journal of Internal Medicine. 256 (3): 240–246. doi:10.1111/J.1365-2796.2004.01380.X. ISSN 0954-6820. PMID 15324367. Wikidata Q35868499.
- Lindsay A. Farrer; L A Cupples; J L Haines; et al. (22 October 1997). "Effects of age, sex, and ethnicity on the association between apolipoprotein E genotype and Alzheimer disease. A meta-analysis. APOE and Alzheimer Disease Meta Analysis Consortium". JAMA. 278 (16): 1349–56. doi:10.1001/JAMA.1997.03550160069041. ISSN 0098-7484. PMID 9343467. Wikidata Q28252389.
- Adam E Locke; Bratati Kahali; Sonja I Berndt; et al. (12 February 2015). "Genetic studies of body mass index yield new insights for obesity biology". Nature. 518 (7538): 197–206. doi:10.1038/NATURE14177. ISSN 1476-4687. PMC 4382211. PMID 25673413. Wikidata Q22305005.
- Jean-Charles Lambert; Carla Ibrahim-Verbaas; Denise Harold; et al. (December 2013). "Meta-analysis of 74,046 individuals identifies 11 new susceptibility loci for Alzheimer's disease". Nature Genetics. 45 (12): 1452–1458. doi:10.1038/NG.2802. ISSN 1061-4036. PMC 3896259. PMID 24162737. Wikidata Q22251067.
