= OFH =

OFH may refer to:

- Our Future Health, UK health research project
- Overseas Filipino Hospital, an agency of the Philippines Department of Migrant Workers
