= Old Road, Oxford =

Road in Headington, east Oxford, England

Coordinates: 51.753°N 1.195°W

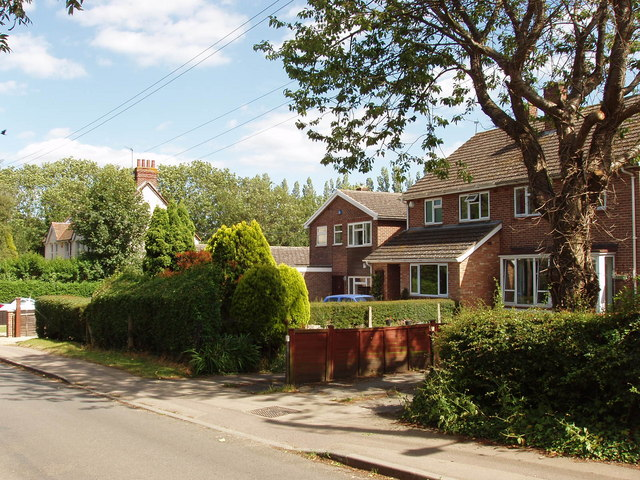
Houses on Old Road in Littleworth, near Wheatley

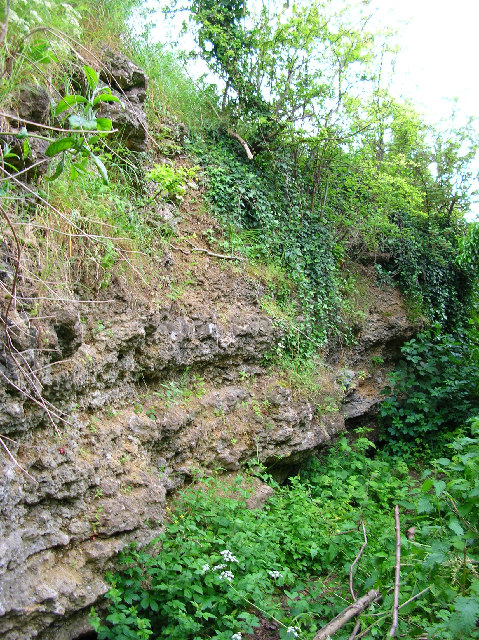
An old limestone quarry at Rock Edge, near the junction of Old Road and Windmill Road

Old Road is a long street in Headington, east Oxford, England, extending into Oxfordshire as a road east of Oxford, to Littleworth near Wheatley. It is part of the main old road between Oxford and London until the late 18th century, passing over Shotover Hill. Nowadays it crosses the Oxford Ring Road (A4142) with a bridge.

At the western end, Old Road connects with Warneford Lane, Gypsy Road, and Roosevelt Drive, close to Cheney School and the Warneford Hospital. Travelling east, the Nuffield Department of Orthopaedics, Rheumatology and Musculoskeletal Sciences (NDORMS) and Rock Edge Nature Reserve (including the old Rock Edge quarry site, a Site of Special Scientific Interest) are to the north, near the junction with Windmill Road (north) and The Slade (south). Passing across Eastern By-Pass Road (A4142, part of the Oxford Ring Road), the road passed through Shotover Country Park. The paved section of the road end in a car park next to Shotover Country Park, and the road continues largely as a dirt track until it reaches a small reservoir. At the eastern end, Old Road joins Littleworth Road in Littleworth on the outskirts of Wheatley.

Due to the unpaved section, Old Road today acts as two separate roads, one on Oxford (and leading to Shotover Country Park just outside the city) and a shorter section being a de facto cul-de-sac in Littleworth.

The Old Road Campus of Oxford University, to the south of Old Road, is named after the road.
