= Richard Doll =

British physician and epidemiologist (1912–2005)

Sir Richard Doll CH OBE FRS
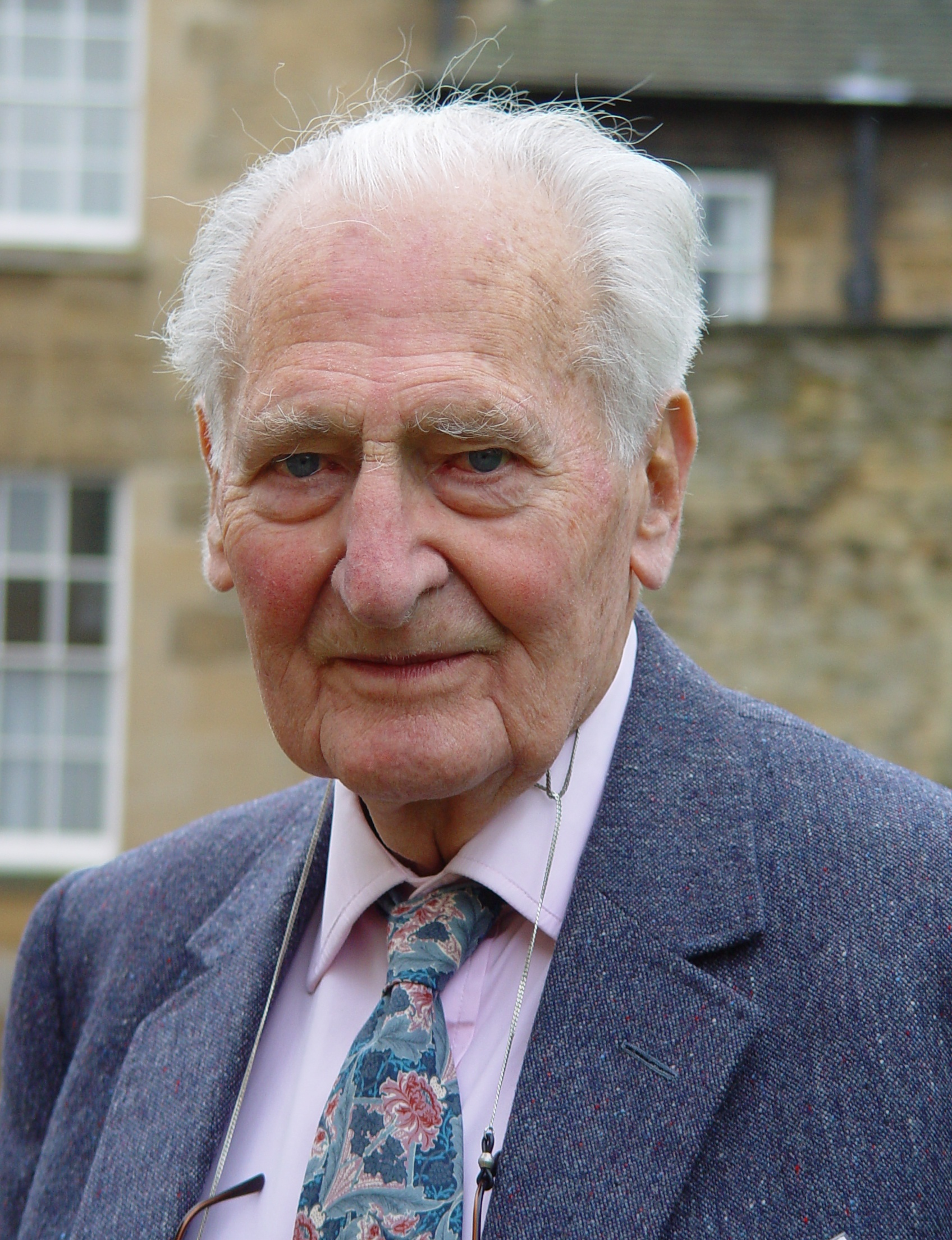
- Richard Doll in 2002
- Born: William Richard Shaboe Doll; 28 October 1912; Hampton, Middlesex, England
- Died: 24 July 2005 (aged 92); Oxford, England
- Education: St Thomas's Hospital Medical School
- Known for: Epidemiology of smoking Armitage–Doll model
- Awards: Gairdner Foundation International Award (1970); Buchanan Medal (1972); Charles S. Mott Prize (1979); Royal Medal (1986); Prince Mahidol Award (1992); Shaw Prize (2004); Gold Medal for Radiation Protection (2004); King Faisal International Prize (2005)
- Scientific career
- Fields: Physiology; Epidemiology

Sir William Richard Shaboe Doll CH OBE FRS (28 October 1912 – 24 July 2005) was a British physician who became an epidemiologist in the mid-20th century and made important contributions to that discipline. He was a pioneer in research linking smoking to health problems. With Ernst Wynder, Bradford Hill and Evarts Graham, he was credited with being the first to prove that smoking increased the risk of lung cancer and heart disease. (German studies had suggested a link as early as the 1920s but were forgotten or ignored until the 1990s.)

He also carried out pioneering work on the relationship between radiation and leukaemia as well as that between asbestos and lung cancer, and alcohol and breast cancer. He however, initially for many years, stood in opposition to research done by Alice Stewart which connected radiation exposure of pregnant mothers to development of leukaemia in their children due to her 'questionable' analysis. On 28 June 2012, he was the subject of an episode of The New Elizabethans, a series broadcast on BBC Radio Four to mark the Diamond Jubilee of Queen Elizabeth II, dealing with 60 public figures from her reign.

== Biography ==
Doll was born at Hampton, Middlesex (now part of south-west London) into an affluent family, though his father's work as a doctor was cut short by multiple sclerosis. Educated first at Westminster School, Doll originally intended (against the wishes of his parents that he become a doctor like his father) to study mathematics at Trinity College, Cambridge. Doll later recalled he failed the final of four examinations for a college scholarship through having drunk three pints of the College's 8% alcohol own-brewed beer the night before. He was offered an exhibition instead, but refused to take it up.

He chose instead to follow his parents' wishes and study medicine at St Thomas's Hospital Medical School (since merged into King's College London) from where he graduated in 1937. Doll was a socialist, and one of the significant figures in the Socialist Medical Association whose campaign helped lead to the creation of Britain's postwar National Health Service. He joined the Royal College of Physicians after the outbreak of World War II and served for much of the war as a part of the Royal Army Medical Corps on a hospital ship as a medical specialist.

After the war, Doll returned to St Thomas's to research asthma. In 1948 he joined a research team under Dr Francis Avery-Jones at the Central Middlesex Hospital, run under the auspices of the statistical research unit of the Medical Research Council. Over a 21-year career in the unit, Doll rose to become its director. His research there initially focused on the role of occupational factors in causing peptic ulcers.

In 1950, he undertook, with Austin Bradford Hill, a study of lung cancer patients in twenty London hospitals, at first under the belief that it was due to the new material tarmac, or motor car fumes, but rapidly discovering that tobacco smoking was the only factor they had in common. Doll himself stopped smoking as a result of his findings, published in the British Medical Journal in 1950, which concluded:

The risk of developing the disease increases in proportion to the amount smoked. It may be 50 times as great among those who smoke 25 or more cigarettes a day as among non-smokers.

Four years later, in 1954, the British doctors study, a study of some 40,000 doctors over 20 years, confirmed the suggestion, based on which the government issued advice that smoking and lung cancer rates were related. In 1955, Doll reported a case-controlled study that firmly established the relationship between asbestos and lung cancer.

In 1966, Doll was elected to the Royal Society. The citation stated:

Doll is distinguished for his researches in epidemiology, and particularly the epidemiology of cancer where in the last 10 years he has played a prominent part in (a) elucidating the causes of lung cancer in industry (asbestos, nickel & coal tar workers) & more generally, in relation to cigarette smoking, and (b) in the investigation of leukaemia particularly in relation to radiation, where using the mortality of patients treated with radiotherapy he has reached a quantitative estimate of the leukaemogenic effects of such radiation. In clinical medicine he has made carefully controlled trials of treatments for gastric ulcer. He has been awarded the United Nations prize for outstanding research into the causes & control of cancer & the Bisset Hawkins medal of the Royal College of Physicians for his contributions to preventative medicine.

In 1969, Doll moved to Oxford University, to sit as the Regius Professor of Medicine, succeeding the clinical researcher Sir George Pickering. Initially, epidemiology was held in low regard, but in his time at Oxford he helped reverse this. He was the primary agent behind the creation of Green College, which was founded in 1979. Doll was appointed the first Warden of Green College, whence he retired in 1983. Green College merged with Templeton College in 2008 to become Green Templeton College, which is located on the site that was previously Green College.

Doll also helped found the National Blood Service, and was key in avoiding a system of paying donors for their blood, as had been adopted in the United States. His continued work into carcinogens at the Imperial Cancer Research Centre at the John Radcliffe Hospital, Oxford, working as part of the Clinical Trial Service Unit, notably including a study undertaken with Richard Peto, in which it was estimated that tobacco, along with infections and diet, caused three-quarters of all cancers, which was the basis of any of the World Health Organization's conclusions on environmental pollution and cancer.

Doll was made a Fellow of the Royal Society (FRS) in 1966, knighted in 1971, and awarded the Edward Jenner Medal of the Royal Society of Medicine in 1981. Also in 1981, Doll became a founding member of the World Cultural Council. He was a member of the Norwegian Academy of Science and Letters from 1976.

In 1996, he was made a Member of the Order of the Companions of Honour (CH) for "services of national importance". International honours included the Presidential Award of the New York Academy of Sciences as well as a United Nations Award for his research into cancer. In April 2005, he was awarded the Saudi Arabian King Faisal International Prize for medicine jointly with Peto for their work on diseases related to smoking. In 2004, he was awarded the inaugural Shaw Prize for Life Sciences and Medicine for his contribution to modern cancer epidemiology. He was also awarded honorary degrees by thirteen different universities.

He was a supporter of the Liberal Democrats at the 2005 general election.

== Death ==
He died on 24 July 2005, at the John Radcliffe Hospital in Oxford after a short illness.

On 7 June 2015, a blue plaque was unveiled at his home at 12 Rawlinson Road.

He was an atheist.

== Building ==
The Richard Doll Building, Oxford

The Richard Doll Building in Headington, east Oxford, designed by Nicholas Hare Architects in 2006, was named in his honour and opened shortly before his death. It houses the Clinical Trial Service Unit, Cancer Epidemiology Unit and National Perinatal Epidemiology Unit. The building received an RIBA Award in 2007. A plaque inside the building contains the following quotation from Doll:

Death in old age is inevitable, but death before old age is not. In previous centuries 70 years used to be regarded as humanity's allotted span of life, and only about one in five lived to such an age. Nowadays, however, for non-smokers in Western countries, the situation is reversed: only about one in five will die before 70, and the non-smoker death rates are still decreasing, offering the promise, at least in developed countries, of a world where death before 70 is uncommon. For this promise to be properly realised, ways must be found to limit the vast damage that is now being done by tobacco and to bring home, not only to the many millions of people in developed countries but also the far larger populations elsewhere, the extent to which those who continue to smoke are shortening their expectation of life by so doing.

One of the buildings of the Institute of Cancer Research in Sutton, London is also named after Sir Richard Doll.

== Research funding ==
After Richard Doll's death, some controversy arose over aspects of his research funding when his papers, held at the Wellcome Library, indicated that for many years he had received consultancy payments from chemical companies whose products he was to defend in court.

These include US$1,500 per day consultancy fee from the Monsanto Company for a relationship which began in 1976 and continued until 2002. During this period Doll wrote to a Royal Commission in Australia investigating whether the Monsanto-produced herbicide Agent Orange, which was used during the Vietnam War, was carcinogenic, claiming that there was no evidence that it caused cancer.

He also received £15,000 from the Chemical Manufacturers Association, Dow Chemicals, and ICI for a review published in 1988 that concluded that workplace exposure to vinyl chloride did not increase the chance of contracting cancer, with the exception of angiosarcoma of the liver, contradicting two previous reviews by the World Health Organization's International Agency for Research on Cancer.

Some donations, including a £50,000 gift from asbestos company Turner and Newall, were given in a public ceremony to Green College, Oxford, but most fees and payments remained undisclosed to the public, Oxford University and colleagues until his death. His defenders point out that his connections to industry were widely known by those in the field, that he did his work before formal disclosure of commercial interests became commonplace and that on occasion, he came to conclusions that were unpalatable to the companies who consulted him. His own view, as reported by Richard Peto – who criticised the allegations, claiming they originated with people aiming to damage Doll's reputation – was that it was necessary to co-operate with companies for access to data which could prove their products to be dangerous. Peto said also that Doll gave all his fees from such work to Green College, Oxford, which he had founded.

Some controversy arose over the fact that he did not publish a paper on 'A tentative estimate of the leukaemogenic effects of test thermonuclear explosions' in the Journal of Radiation Protection in 1955 which stated that 'there is no threshold [radiation] dose below which no effect is produced' in humans. He withdrew it on advice from Sir Harold Himsworth, Secretary of the MRC (Medical Research Council), who in turn was advised by the Atomic Energy Authority not to publish because it would be contrary to their interests. It was only published in 1996 when this kind of view was more acceptable to the nuclear industry.

== See also ==
- Health effects of tobacco
- Lennox Johnston
