= Centre for Medicines Discovery =

UK academic institution

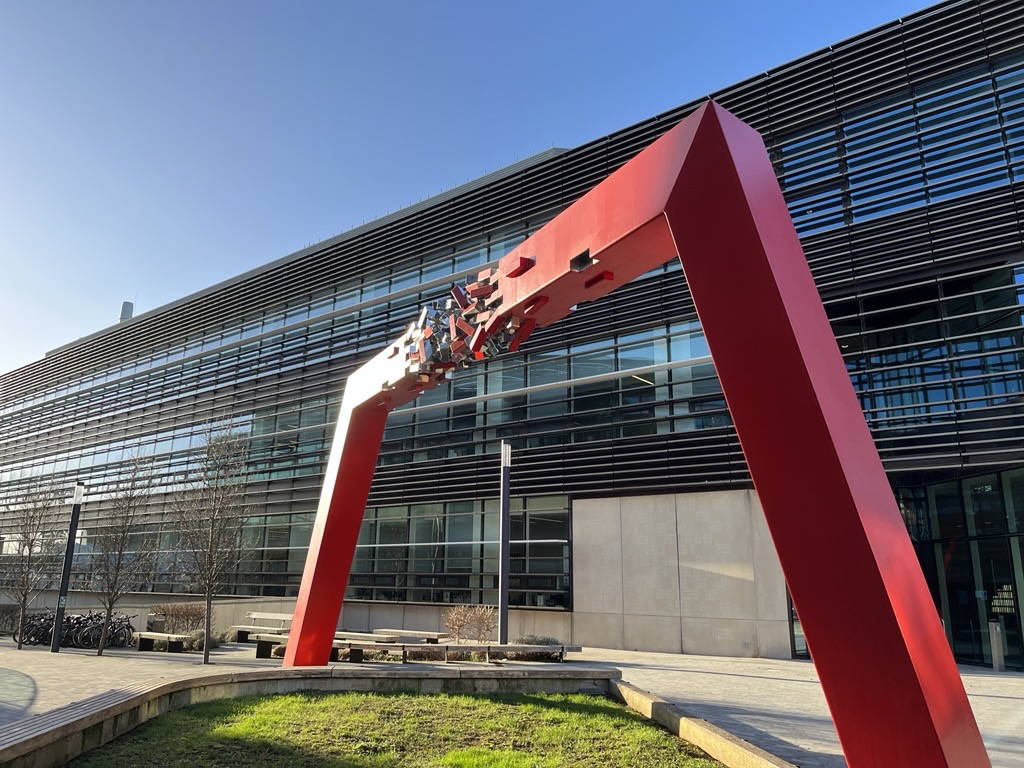
- NDM Research Building, location of the CMD
- Parent institution: University of Oxford
- Established: 2020; 6 years ago
- Director: Paul Brennan
- Faculty: 13
- Staff: 142
- Formerly called: Structural Genomics Consortium Oxford
- Address: NDM Research Building (NDMRB), Roosevelt Drive, Oxford OX3 7DQ, UK
- Location: Oxford, United Kingdom
- Coordinates: 51°45′11″N 1°12′55″W
- Interactive map of Centre for Medicines Discovery
- Website: www.cmd.ox.ac.uk

The Centre for Medicines Discovery (CMD) is an academic department focused on translational research in the Medical Sciences Division at the University of Oxford. It is located at the Old Road Campus in Headington, Oxford, England, United Kingdom.

== History ==
The CMD was established in 2020 with teams from Oxford's Target Discovery Institute and Structural Genomics Consortium to focus on translational research. The Alzheimer's Research UK (ARUK)-funded Oxford Drug Discovery Institute has been embededded within the CMD since 2015 to work on neuroscience targets. As of 2026, the head of the department is Prof. Paul Brennan, who took over from Professor Chas Boutra in 2023.

In 2026, a spin-out from Oxford developing therapeutics to leukemia, Dark Blue Therapeutics, which was founded with contributions from researchers at the CMD, was purchased by Amgen in a deal valued at up to $840 million.

== Research ==
The CMD has worked on chemical probe development and target enablement through public-private consortia such as the Innovative Medicines Initiative and the Structural Genomics Consortium and foundations such as ARUK's Dementia Research Institute.

As of 2026, the CMD's focus areas are Neuroscience, Anti-infectives, Rare Disease, and Oncology. and their work includes:

- Testing the repurposing of existing cancer drugs for glioblastoma.
- Direct collaborations with pharma for discovery and develop of new therapeutics to oncology and central nervous system (CNS) diseases, including Parkinson's disease.
- Leading the COVID Moonshot project to crowdsource antivirals to the SARS-CoV-2 virus.
- Working with the Novo Nordisk Foundation, Gates Foundation, and Wellcome Trust for new mechanisms to combat antimicrobial resistance.
- Collaborating with David Baker, Diamond Light Source, and other Oxford teams for the OpenBind consortium to support Artificial Intelligence in drug discovery.
- Partnering with King Abdulaziz University for drug discovery targeting rare, cardiac, and metabolic diseases.
