= Maureen Kelley =

American social scientist

Academic background
- Education: Rice University, University of North Carolina at Charlotte

Academic work
- Discipline: Bioethics, women's health, research ethics
- Institutions: Oregon Health & Science University; Nuffield Department of Population Health, University of Oxford

Maureen Kelley is the Wallace and Mona Wu Chair in Bioethics at Wake Forest University's Centre for Bioethics, Health & Society. Previous to this role she held a Chair in Ethics Education and Professor of Medicine at Oregon Health & Science University, Portland, and Professor of Bioethics at the Nuffield Department of Population Health, University of Oxford, England from 2016 to 2022. She has previously served on the World Health Organization's COVID-19 research ethics review committee.

== Education ==
Kelley received her PhD in philosophy with a specialization in bioethics from Rice University, Houston, Texas. She also holds an MA from the University of North Carolina at Charlotte.

== Career and research ==
Prior to joining the University of Oxford in 2016 Kelley was a faculty member at the Treuman Katz Center for Pediatric Bioethics, Seattle Children's Hospital, Seattle, Washington, and the Department of Pediatrics at the University of Washington School of Medicine. She has also held affiliate faculty membership at Houston Methodist Hospital in Texas as well as appointments at Baylor College of Medicine and the University of Alabama's Sparkman Center for Global Health. Kelley moved to the University of Oxford in 2016 as a senior member of the Ethox Centre, a research group working on health research ethics.

Kelley is a safeguarding expert for the UK Collaborative on Development Research. She is also a member of the advisory board for the European Union Border Care project, a comparative study of the politics of maternity care among undocumented migrants on the EU’s peripheries, funded by the European Research Council. Kelley was a member of the World Health Organization's COVID-19 research ethics review committee in 2020, reviewing COVID-19 research projects involving human participants supported either financially or technically by WHO.

Kelley was appointed as the Madeline Brill Nelson Chair in Ethics Education at Oregon Health & Science University in early 2022, she became the Senior Associate Director within OHSU's Center for Ethics in Health Care. In late 2023 she was appointed the Wallace and Mona Wu Chair in Bioethics at Wake Forest University's Centre for Bioethics, Health & Society.

== See also ==
- Nuffield Department of Population Health
