= Sudlow =

Sudlow is a surname. It may refer to:

- Bessie Sudlow (1849–1928), an English burlesque performer and opera bouffe soprano
- Cathie Sudlow, a British neurologist
- Phebe Sudlow (1831–1922), first female superintendent of a public school in the United States
