= Duin =

Duin is a Dutch surname. It comes from the Middle Dutch dūne and was originally given to someone who lived near a sand dune. Notable people with this surname include:

- André van Duin (born 1947), Dutch actor in comedy and theatre
- Garrelt Duin (born 1968), German politician
- Julia Duin, American journalist and author

Duin is also the title of the Dutch adaptation of the popular novel, Dune.

== See also ==
- Van Duijn
