= Janet Sinsheimer =

American statistician (1957–2023)

Janet Suzanne Sinsheimer (August 28, 1957 – March 14, 2023) was an American expert in statistical genetics who worked as a professor of human genetics, biomathematics and biostatistics in the Fielding School of Public Health at the University of California, Los Angeles. Topics in her research included genome-wide association studies, epigenetics, and Bayesian methods for phylogenetics.

== Early life ==
Janet Sinsheimer was born in Montclair, New Jersey in 1957, the second of three children.

== Education ==
Sinsheimer graduated from Brown University in 1979, majoring in chemistry. She earned a master's degree in biochemistry in 1985 from Brandeis University, a second master's degree in biomathematics in 1988 from the University of California, Los Angeles (UCLA), and a Ph.D. in biomathematics in 1994 from UCLA. Her dissertation, Extensions to Evolutionary Parsimony, concerned phylogeny (the inference of evolutionary trees), and was jointly supervised by evolutionary biologist James A. Lake and biostatistician Roderick J. A. Little.

== Recognition ==
Sinsheimer became a Fellow of the American Statistical Association in 2013. The Linnean Society of London elected her as a fellow in 2014. In 2017 the Boston University Department of Biostatistics gave her the L. Adrienne Cupples Award for Excellence in Teaching, Research, and Service in Biostatistics.
