= Raghib Ali =

CEO of Our Future Health

Raghib Ali OBE FRCP (born September 1975) is a clinical epidemiologist whose research focuses on the causes, prevention and treatment of diseases including diabetes, heart disease and cancer, and on reducing health inequalities among under-represented groups.

He is currently the Chief Executive, Chief Medical Officer and Chief Investigator of Our Future Health, a collaboration between the public, charity and private sectors to build the UK's largest health research programme. The research aims to develop new ways to prevent, detect and treat disease.

Ali was awarded the OBE in the 2022 Queen's Birthday Honours for his services to the NHS and response to the COVID-19 pandemic.

== Early life and education ==
Ali grew up and went to school in Bedford. He attended Woodside Middle School before gaining entry to Bedford Modern School on a full scholarship through the government-assisted place scheme.

He studied for an BA (Medical Sciences), and MB, BChir (Bachelor of Medicine, Bachelor of Surgery) at St Catherine's College, University of Cambridge (2000), and graduated with the John Addenbrookes Prize for Medicine.

== Career ==
Ali has been a consultant in acute medicine at the Oxford University Hospitals NHS Trust, and was a clinical epidemiologist in the Nuffield Department of Population Health from 2009 to 2017.

From 2014- he was Principal Investigator for the UAE Healthy Future Study, a cohort study in the Middle East with a focus on obesity, diabetes and cardiovascular disease, as well as Director of the Public Health Research Center and Research Professor at New York University Abu Dhabi

During the COVID-19 pandemic, Ali volunteered to return to work as a front-line NHS doctor in A&E at the John Radcliffe Hospital, Oxford. He was also appointed as a government advisor, working with the Government's Race Disparity Unit and the Office of National Statistics to better understand why people from ethnic minority backgrounds were disproportionally affected by COVID-19

In 2022, Ali joined the leadership team of Our Future Health (the UK's large-scale health research programme) as Chief Medical Officer (CMO) to lead on the recruitment strategy and partnership with the NHS. He was appointed as the programme's permanent Chief Executive in September 2023 (in addition to his role as CMO and Chief Investigator). Ali also currently holds a position of Clinical Research Professor at the University of Cambridge.

== Awards and honours ==
He was awarded the OBE in the Queen's Birthday Honours 2022 for services to the NHS and the COVID-19 response.

He is a Fellow of the Royal College of Physicians and was elected Honorary Fellow of the Faculty of Public Health in April 2023.
