= James A. Lake =

American scientist (born 1941)

- Born: August 10, 1941 (age 85); Kearney, Nebraska, United States
- Education: University of Wisconsin; University of Colorado Boulder
- Known for: Symbiogenesis
- Awards: Darwin–Wallace Medal
- Scientific career
- Fields: Evolutionary biology
- Workplaces: University of California, Los Angeles
- Doctoral students: Janet Sinsheimer

James A. Lake (born August 10, 1941) is an American evolutionary biologist and a Distinguished Professor of Molecular, Cell, and Developmental Biology and of Human Genetics at UCLA. Lake is best known for the New Animal Phylogeny and for the first three-dimensional structure of the ribosome. He has also made significant contributions to understanding genome evolution across all kingdoms of life, including discovering informational and operational genes, elucidating the complexity hypothesis for gene transfer, rooting the tree of life, and understanding the early transition from prokaryotic to eukaryotic life.

== Education ==
Jim Lake graduated from the University of Colorado, Boulder with a BA in physics in 1963. In 1967 he was awarded a Ph.D. in physics from the University of Wisconsin, Madison on the structure of tRNA. Following postdocs in Molecular Biology at MIT and Harvard Medical School, an Assistant Professorship of Cell Biology in George Palade's Department at Rockefeller University (1970–1973) and an Associate Professorship of Cell Biology at NYU Medical School (1973–1976), he became a Professor of Molecular Biology in Biology at UCLA in 1976 and is currently a Distinguished Professor of Molecular, Cell, and Developmental Biology and of Human Genetics.

== Research ==
Lake's research focuses in four areas: prokaryotic ancestors of eukaryotes, evidence for early prokaryotic endosymbioses, genomic analyses, and rooting of the biological tree of life.

=== Darwin-Wallace Medal ===
In 2011, Lake was presented the Darwin-Wallace Medal by the Linnean Society of London for elucidating the new animal phylogeny. The Medal is awarded to individuals who have made major advances in evolutionary biology. Lake has made a number of highly significant contributions toward understanding diverse aspects of genome evolution across all kingdoms of life. These include discovering informational and operational genes, developing the complexity hypothesis for horizontal/lateral gene transfer, and rooting the tree of life, topics on which he has published over 160 papers.

In the mid-1980s it was becoming clear that ribosomal RNA sequences could be used to determine metazoan relationships. Interpretation of the trees was complicated by the problem of Long branch attraction (LBA). By developing new algorithms that were less sensitive to these LBA artefacts, Lake was able to show that the Annelida-Mollusca lineage is the sister group of an arthropod subgroup. This finding was contrary to the Articulata hypothesis that grouped arthropods with annelids, and was nearly universally endorsed at that time.

With the advent of PCR and increased ease of sequencing rDNA in the 1990s, Lake focused on the bilateral animals, and recognised that there were questions over the placement of the lophophorate animals, such as bryozoans, phoronids, and brachiopods. Lake provided clear DNA-based evidence indicating that the lophophorates were not deuterostomes as had been widely believed. In fact, they were most closely related to the mollusc – annelid clade. The result of this research was the creation of a new super-phylum, the Lophotrochozoa containing molluscs, annelids, lophophorates, and other animals. Lake recognised that long branch attraction was a severe problem for the mostly rapidly evolving nematodes and was able to provide rDNA sequences from a number of slowly evolving nematodes in order to bypass this difficulty. This sampling showed that the moulting animals form a clade, called the Ecdysozoa, a second protostomian superphylum sister to the Lophotrochozoa.

=== Endosymbiosis research ===
Lake also explored concepts concerning the deep phylogenetic origins of the eukaryotic cell. In the eocyte hypothesis, Lake and colleagues proposed that eukaryotes (animals, fungi, plants, and protists) evolved from a specific group of thermophilic prokaryotes, the "eocyte" archaebacteria.
