= Van Duijn =

Van Duijn, Van Duin, and Van (der) Duyn are Dutch toponymic surnames, meaning "from the dune". People with this surname include:

- André van Duin (born 1947), Dutch comedian and actor
- Cornelia van Duijn, Dutch epidemiologist
- Faith Van Duin (born 1986), New Zealand mixed martial artist
- Jaap van Duijn (born 1990), Dutch footballer
- Karl van Duyn Teeter (1929–2007), American linguist
- Marco van Duin (born 1987), Dutch footballer
- Mona Van Duyn (1921–2004), American poet
- Roel van Duijn (born 1943), Dutch politician, political activist and writer
- Terry Van Duyn, North Carolina senator
- Van der Duyn a Dutch noble family, including
  - Frans Adam van der Duyn van Maasdam (1771–1848), Dutch officer and politician
  - Susanna Maria van der Duyn (1698–1780), Dutch actress
