= Cathie Sudlow =

British neurologist

Catherine (Cathie) Sudlow Professor
- Citizenship: British
- Spouse: Charles Warlow

Academic work
- Discipline: Neurology and Clinical Epidemiology
- Institutions: University of Edinburgh, Adolescent Health Study, Health Data Research UK
- Website: https://www.hdruk.ac.uk/people/cathie-sudlow/ https://edwebprofiles.ed.ac.uk/profile/professor-catherine-sudlow

Catherine Sudlow OBE FRSE is a British neurologist. She is a professor of Neurology and Clinical Epidemiology and Head of the Centre for Medical Informatics at the Usher Institute of Population Health Sciences and Informatics at the University of Edinburgh. She is the Chief Scientist of UK Biobank, an honorary Consultant Neurologist in the Division of Clinical Neurosciences in Edinburgh and Director of the British Heart Foundation Data Science Centre.

== Career ==
=== Research ===
Sudlow's research focuses on the epidemiology and genetic causes of stroke. She is the principal investigator of the Edinburgh Stroke Study, which investigates the risk factors for and prognosis of different types of ischaemic stroke. By 2005, the Edinburgh Stroke Study had recruited 2160 patients with stroke or transient ischaemic attacks, and these patients were followed up for between one and four years to identify those who had a further stroke, and myocardial infarction, or who died.

She was appointed as the Head of the Centre for Medical Informatics at the Usher Institute of Population Health Sciences and Informatics at the University of Edinburgh in August 2017. Her inaugural lecture, 'Big data, big picture, big challenge,' described how big data can be used to study the causes of diseases, and the effects of treatments.

In October 2019, Professor Sudlow was appointed as Director of the British Heart Foundation Data Science Centre.

=== UK Biobank Chief Scientist ===
UK Biobank is a prospective cohort study of over 500,000 British adults, who were recruited between 2006-2010 when aged 40–69. Sudlow oversees the development of linkages between routinely collected primary and secondary healthcare records, death and cancer registers with data held on over 500,000 UK Biobank participants. She works with the UK Biobank Imaging, Enhancements and Follow-up and Outcomes working groups, which aim to improve the UK Biobank as a resource for researchers. The UK Biobank Imaging Study aims to perform brain, cardiac and body magnetic resonance imaging, carotid Doppler ultrasound and dual-energy x-ray absorptiometry scanning in 100,000 people. As Chief Scientist, Sudlow oversees the handling of incidental findings detected during the collection of the UK Biobank's research imaging.

== Honours and awards ==
In 2018 she was elected a Fellow of the Royal Society of Edinburgh. She was appointed Officer of the Order of the British Empire (OBE) in the 2020 Birthday Honours for services to medical research. She was elected a Fellow of the Academy of Medical Sciences in 2022.

== Select publications ==
- Cathie Sudlow; John Gallacher; Allen, Naomi; et al. (2015). "UK biobank: an open access resource for identifying the causes of a wide range of complex diseases of middle and old age". PLOS Medicine. 12 (3) e1001779. doi:10.1371/journal.pmed.1001779. PMC 4380465. PMID 25826379. Wikidata Q28650740.
- The Brainstorm Consortium; Anttila, Verneri; Brendan Bulik-Sullivan; et al. (2018). "Analysis of shared heritability in common disorders of the brain". Science. 360 (6395) eaap8757. doi:10.1126/science.aap8757. PMC 6097237. PMID 29930110. Wikidata Q55128222.
- Traylor, Matthew; Farrall, Martin; Holliday, Elizabeth; et al. (2012). "Genetic risk factors for ischaemic stroke and its subtypes (the METASTROKE collaboration): a meta-analysis of genome-wide association studies". The Lancet Neurology. 11 (11): 951–962. doi:10.1016/s1474-4422(12)70234-x. PMC 3490334. PMID 23041239. Wikidata Q29417025.
