= COVID Moonshot =

Project developing antiviral drug

External videos
- "How Humans Are Crowdsourcing a Cure to COVID-19", Coffee Break, May 3, 2020
- “Data coordination strategies used in the COVID Moonshot initiative”, Lizbe Koekemoer, Oxford University, November 17, 2020
- "Could the COVID Moonshot change how we design drugs?", Folding@home, January 21, 2021

The COVID Moonshot is a collaborative open-science project started in March 2020 with the goal of developing an un-patented oral antiviral drug to treat SARS-CoV-2, the virus causing COVID-19. COVID Moonshot researchers are targeting the proteins needed to form functioning new viral proteins. They are particularly interested in proteases such as 3C-like protease (Mpro), a coronavirus nonstructural protein that mediates the breaking and replication of proteins.

COVID Moonshot may be the first open-science community effort for the development of an antiviral drug. Hundreds of scientists around the world, from academic and industrial organizations, have shared their expertise, resources, data, and results to more rapidly identify, screen, and test candidate compounds for the treatment of COVID-19.

== Project history ==
Development of antiviral drugs is a complicated and time-consuming multistage process. The public sharing of information in the early stages of genome identification and protein structure identification has accelerated the process of searching for COVID-19 treatments and established a basis for the COVID Moonshot initiative.

=== Genome identification ===
On January 3, 2020, Chinese virologist Yong-Zhen Zhang of Fudan University and the Shanghai Public Health Clinical Center received a test sample from Wuhan, China, where patients had a pneumonia-like illness. By January 5, Zhang and his team had sequenced a virus from the sample and deposited its genome on GenBank, an international research database maintained by the United States National Center for Biotechnology Information. By January 11, 2020, Edward C. Holmes of the University of Sydney had Zhang's permission to publicly release the genome.

=== Protein structures ===
With that information, structural biologists world-wide began examining its protein structures. Investigators from the Center for Structural Genomics of Infectious Diseases (CSGID) and other groups began working to characterize the 3D structure of the proteins, sharing their results via the Protein Data Bank (PDB).

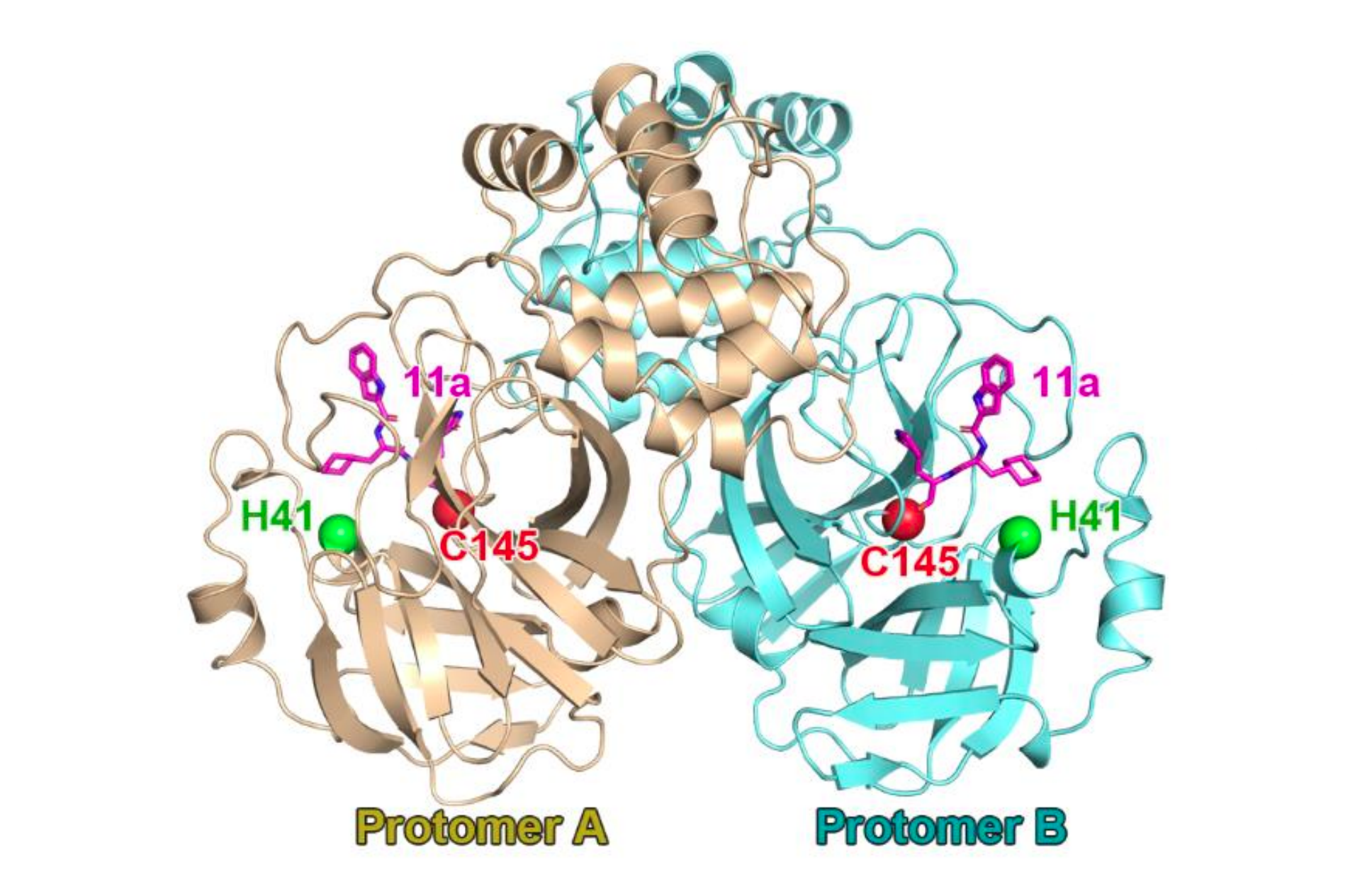
SARS-CoV-2 main proteinase dimer with the catalytic dyad (H41; C145) in complex with protease inhibitor chemical 11a (PDB: 6LZE)

Scientists were able to identify a key protein in the virus: 3C-like protease (Mpro). Crucial early X-ray crystallography was done by Zihe Rao and Haitao Yang in Shanghai, China. On January 26, 2020, they submitted a structure of Mpro bound to an inhibitor to the Protein Data Bank. It was released as of February 5, 2020. Rao began coordinating with David Stuart and Martin Walsh at Diamond Light Source, the United Kingdom's synchrotron facility. The Diamond group was able to develop and release a high-resolution crystal structure of unbound Mpro.

Approaches to accelerating drug development have been suggested, but identification of proteins and drug development commonly take years. It was possible to sequence the virus and characterize key proteins extremely quickly because the new virus was somewhat familiar. It had a 70–80% sequence similarity to the proteins in the SARS-CoV coronavirus that caused the SARS outbreak in 2002. Researchers could therefore build on what was already known about previous coronaviruses.

=== Possible targets ===
Identifying and recreating viral proteins in the lab is a first step to developing drugs to attack them and vaccines to protect against them. The COVID Moonshot initiative follows an approach to structure-based drug design in which researchers attempt to find a molecule that will bind tightly to a drug target and prevent it from carrying out its normal activities.

In the case of SARS-CoV-2, the coronavirus enters the body and then replicates its genomic RNA, building new copies that are incorporated into new, rapidly spreading viral particles. Protease enzymes or proteases are often desirable drug targets, because proteases are important in the formation and spreading of viral particles. Inhibition of viral proteases can inhibit the virus's ability to replicate itself and spread.

3C-like protease (Mpro), a coronavirus nonstructural protein, is one of the main proteins involved in the replication and transcription of SARS-CoV-2. By understanding Mpro's structure and the ways in which it functions, scientists can identify possible candidates to preemptively bind to Mpro and block its activity. Mpro is not the only possible target for drug design, but it is a highly interesting one.

=== Fragment screening ===
In collaboration with the University of Oxford and the Weizmann Institute of Science in Rehovot, Israel, the facilities at Diamond Light were used to develop fragment screens utilizing crystallography and mass spectrometry. Nir London's laboratory at the Weizmann Institute contributed technology for identifying compounds that bind irreversibly to target proteins. Frank von Delft and the Nuffield Department of Medicine at the University of Oxford provided technology for rapid crystallographic fragment screening.

Researchers examined thousands of possible fragments from diverse screening libraries and identified at least 71 possible protein–ligand crystal structures, chemical fragments which might have the potential to bind to Mpro. These results were immediately made available online.

=== Designing candidates ===
The open release of the data and its announcement on Twitter on March 7, 2020, mark a critical point in the formation of COVID Moonshot. The scientists shared their information and challenged chemists worldwide to use that information to design potential openly available antiviral drug candidates. They expected a couple of hundred submissions. By May 2020 more than 4,600 design submissions for potential inhibitors were received. By January 2021, the number of unique compound designs had risen to 14,000. In response, those involved began to shift from a spontaneous virtual collaboration to a larger and more organized network of partners with specialized skills and well-articulated goals.

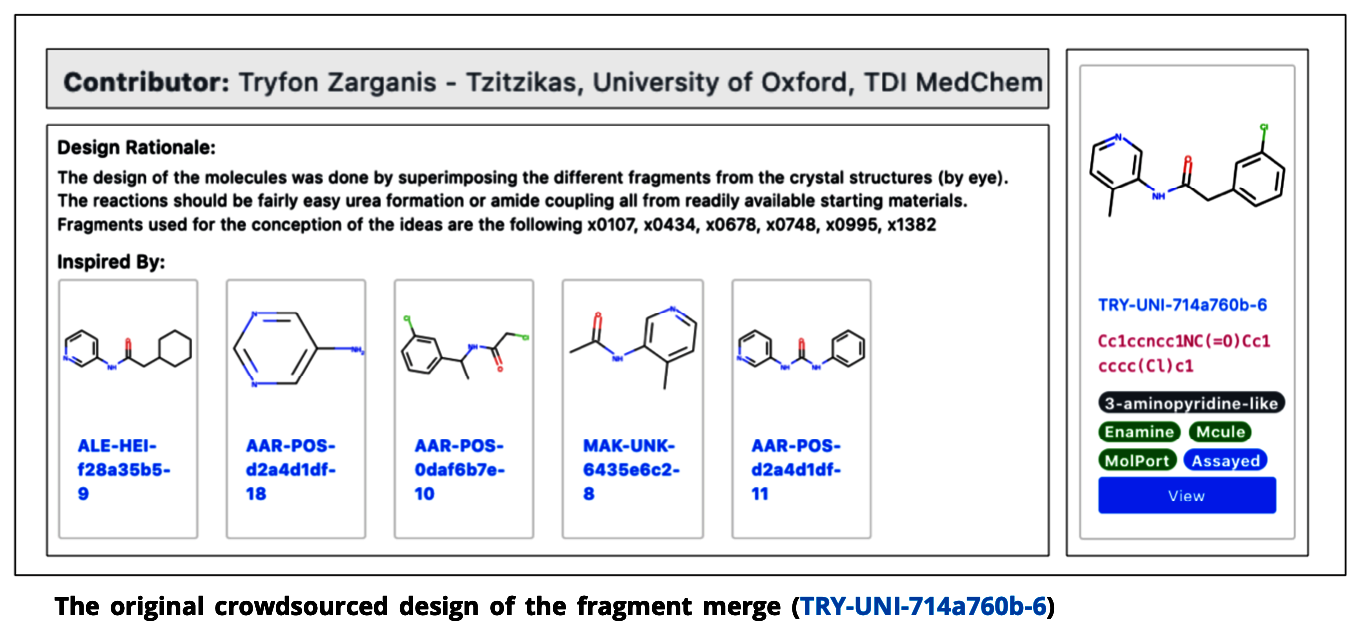
The original crowdsourced design of the fragment merge (TRY-UNI-714a760b-6)

The design submissions were stored in Collaborative Drug Discovery's CDD Vault, a database used for large-scale management of chemical structures, experimental protocols and experimental results. Alpha Lee and Matt Robinson brought computational expertise from PostEra to the project. PostEra used techniques from artificial intelligence and machine learning to develop analysis tools for computational drug discovery, chemical synthesis and biochemical assays. When COVID Moonshot's appeal resulted in not hundreds but thousands of responses, they built a platform capable of triaging large numbers of compounds and designing routes for their synthetic formation.

Supercomputer access was provided through the COVID-19 High Performance Computing (HPC) Consortium, accelerating the speed at which designs could be examined and compared. The distributed supercomputing initiative Folding@home has carried out multiple sprints to model novel protein structures and target desirable structures as a part of COVID Moonshot.

Many of the criteria for selecting drug candidates were determined by the group's goals. An ideal drug candidate would be effective in treating COVID-19. It also would be easily and cheaply made, so that as many countries and companies as possible could produce and distribute it. The ingredients to make it should be easy to obtain, and the processes involved should be as simple as possible. A drug shouldn't require special handling (like refrigeration) and it should be easy to administer (a pill rather than an injection).

In a matter of months, researchers were able to identify more than 200 promising crystal structure designs and to begin creating and testing them in the lab. Chris Schofield at the University of Oxford synthesized and tested 4 of the most promising of the novel designed peptides to demonstrate their ability to block and inhibit Mpro. Freely available data from COVID Moonshot has also been used to assess the predictive ability of docking scores in suggesting the potency of SARS-CoV-2 M-pro inhibitors.

To go beyond the design phase, possible drug candidates must be created and tested for both effectiveness and safety in animal and human trials. The Wellcome Trust has committed to key initial funding to support this process. Synthesis of candidates is being carried out in parallel, at sites including Ukraine (Enamine), India (Sai Life Sciences) and China (WuXi). Annette von Delft of the University of Oxford and the National Institute for Health Research (NIHR)'s Oxford Biomedical Research Centre (BRC) is leading pre-clinical small molecule research related to COVID Moonshot.

== Potential for antiviral treatments ==
COVID Moonshot anticipates that they will select three pre-clinical candidates by March 2022, to be followed by preclinical safety and toxicology testing and identification of needed chemistry, manufacturing and control (CMC) steps. Based on that data, the most promising candidate will be chosen. Phase-1 clinical trials, the first stage of testing in human subjects, are projected to begin by June 2023.

Unlike a vaccine, which increases immunity and protects against catching an infectious disease, an antiviral drug treats someone who is already sick by attacking the virus and countering its effects, potentially lessening both symptoms and further transmission.

Mpro is present in other coronaviruses that cause disease, so an antiviral drug that targets Mpro may also be effective against coronaviruses such as SARS and MERS and future pandemics.

Mpro does not mutate easily, so it is less likely that variants of the virus will adapt that can avoid the effects of such a drug.

== Open science ==
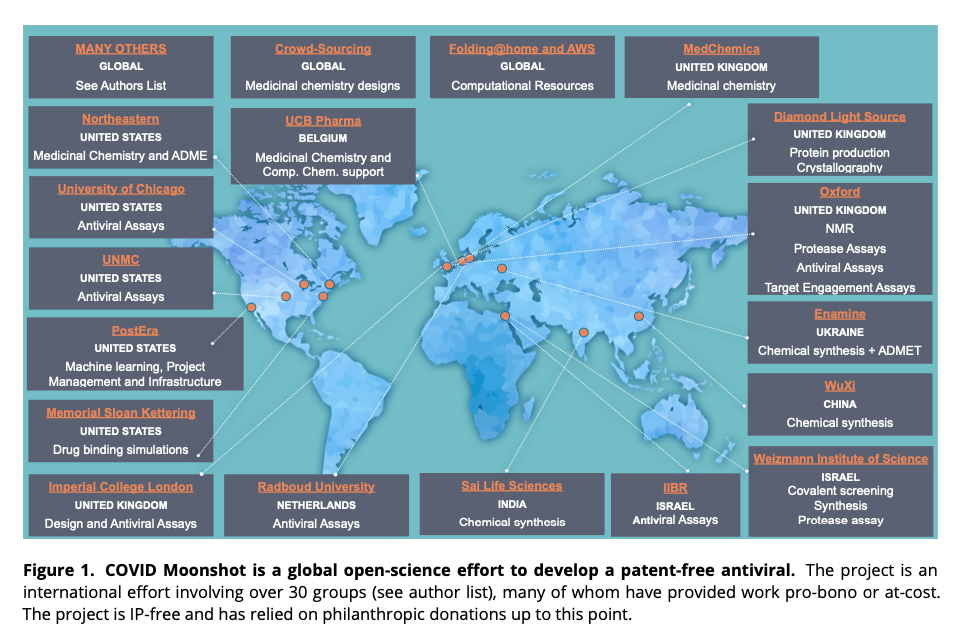
Some of the international participants in COVID Moonshot.

Among the many participants in the COVID Moonshot project are the University of Oxford, University of Cambridge, Diamond Light Source, Weizmann Institute of Science in Rehovot, Israel, Temple University, Memorial Sloan Kettering Cancer Center, PostEra, University of Johannesburg, and the Drugs for Neglected Diseases initiative (DNDi) in Switzerland. Support for the project has come from a variety of philanthropic sources including the Wellcome Trust, COVID-19 Therapeutics Accelerator (CTA), Bill & Melinda Gates Foundation, LifeArc, and through crowdsourcing.

Because COVID Moonshot is based in open science and shared open data, any drug that the project develops can be manufactured and sold by whoever wishes to produce it, worldwide. Countries that are unable to buy or manufacture expensive licensed drugs would therefore have the opportunity to produce their own supplies, and competition between suppliers is likely to result in greater availability and reduced prices for consumers.

This would circumvent issues around the time needed to vaccinate people worldwide. As of July 2021, it was estimated that at current rates, this was likely to take several years. Inequities in distribution will increase both the spreading of the virus and the risk that new and more dangerous variants will emerge.

Supporters of the COVID Moonshot initiative have argued that open-science drug discovery is an essential model for combating both current and future pandemics, and that the prevention of the spread of pandemic diseases is an essential public service.
