= Rock Edge =

Protected area in Oxford, England

- Site of Special Scientific Interest
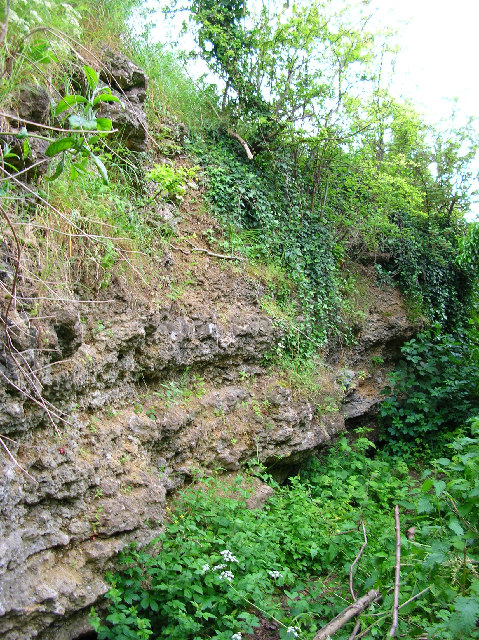
- Location of Rock Edge.
- Area of search: Oxfordshire
- Grid reference: SP 549 064
- Coordinates: 51.754°N 1.205°W
- Interest: Geological
- Area: 1.7 hectares (4.2 acres)
- Notification date: 1986
- Location map: Magic Map

Rock Edge is a 1.7-hectare (4.2-acre) former quarry and geological Site of Special Scientific Interest in Oxford in Oxfordshire, England. It is a Geological Conservation Review site and a Local Nature Reserve

This site exposes limestone rich in coral called Coral rag, laid down when the area was under a warm, shallow sea, similar to the Bahama Banks today. It is rich in fossils derived from the coral reefs. It dates to the Upper Jurassic, around 145 million years ago.

The site was formerly known as Crossroads Pit (or Cross Road Quarry) and has also been called Windmill Quarry since it was located just south of the main windmill in Headington.

== Nature reserve ==
The area is also a nature reserve, Rock Edge Nature Reserve and forms a small park, surrounded by the built-in east-Oxford suburb of Headington.

== Land ownership ==
All land within Rock Edge SSSI is owned by the local authority, Oxford City Council.
