= Cancer Epidemiology Unit =

Medical research institute

The Cancer Epidemiology Unit (CEU) is a medical research institute within Oxford University's Nuffield Department of Population Health in the United Kingdom. It is located in the Richard Doll Building on the Old Road Campus, Headington, Oxford.

== Major projects ==
Major projects run by the CEU include the Million Women Study. The unit is also involved with the UK Biobank project.
