= Richard Doll Building =

Coordinates: 51.751657°N 1.215489°W

The Richard Doll Building

General view of the Old Road Campus with the Richard Doll Building in the distance

The Richard Doll Building (RDB) is a University of Oxford building on the Old Road Campus, in Headington, east Oxford, England. The building is named after the physician and epidemiologist Sir Richard Doll CH OBE FRS (1912–2005).

The building houses the Nuffield Department of Population Health and includes the National Perinatal Epidemiology Unit, Clinical Trial Service Unit, Epidemiological Studies Unit, Cancer Epidemiology Unit, Screening Unit, and the Office of the Regius Professor of Medicine.

The Richard Doll Building was designed by Nicholas Hare Architects in 2006. The building is 9,000m^{2} and won the RIBA South-East Award in 2007.

A plaque inside the building contains the following quotation by Richard Doll:

Death in old age is inevitable, but death before old age is not. In previous centuries 70 years used to be regarded as humanity's allotted span of life, and only about one in five lived to such an age. Nowadays, however, for non-smokers in Western countries, the situation is reversed: only about one in five will die before 70, and the non-smoker death rates are still decreasing, offering the promise, at least in developed countries, of a world where death before 70 is uncommon. For this promise to be properly realised, ways must be found to limit the vast damage that is now being done by tobacco and to bring home, not only to the many millions of people in developed countries but also the far larger populations elsewhere, the extent to which those who continue to smoke are shortening their expectation of life by so doing.
