= Cancer Trials Support Unit =

Service of the National Cancer Institute

The Cancer Trials Support Unit (CTSU) is a service of the National Cancer Institute (NCI) in the United States.

The CTSU facilitates access to NCI-funded clinical trials for qualified clinical sites and supports the management and conduct of those clinical trials.

== History ==
The NCI launched the CTSU in 1999 to streamline and harmonize support services for Phase III Cooperative Group cancer clinical trials funded by the NCI.

CTSU now supports multiple NCI-funded networks and clinical trials of all phases and types. These include cancer treatment, prevention and control, advanced imaging and correlative science studies. The CTSU collaborates with the NCI and its funded organizations to develop and support operational processes and informatics solutions leading to cost-effective solutions that reduce administrative burden on clinical sites.

== NCI research networks ==
The CTSU supports the following NCI cancer research networks:

- The NCI National Clinical Trials Network (NCTN) is a clinical trials research network that provides an infrastructure for NCI treatment, screening and diagnosis trials. The NCTN infrastructure allows investigators to begin clinical trials quicker, reach conclusions faster and offer patients studies that incorporate precision medicine at over 3,000 clinical sites.
- The NCI Experimental Therapeutics Clinical Trials Network (ETCTN) is a clinical trials network that evaluates innovative cancer treatments using a coordinated, collaborative, and inclusive team based approach to early phase experimental therapeutic clinical trials.
- The NCI Community Oncology Research Program (NCORP) is a community based program that brings cancer clinical trials, as well as cancer care delivery research, to individuals in their own communities, thereby generating a broadly applicable evidence base that contributes to improved patient outcomes and a reduction in cancer disparities.

Additional NCI and NIH services that work in conjunction with the CTSU include:

- NCI Central Institutional Review Board (CIRB) - Reduces administrative burden of local institutional review boards and investigators by partnering with local institutions to provide human subject protections by conducting IRB reviews of NCI-sponsored trials.
- NCI Clinical Trials Search - NCI's website helps you find NCI-supported clinical trials that are taking place across the United States, Canada, and internationally. The list includes all NCI network trials.
- NIH ClinicalTrials.gov - A registry and results database that provides easy access to information on clinical studies of human participants conducted around the world.
