= Rock Edge Nature Reserve =

Nature reserve in Oxford, England

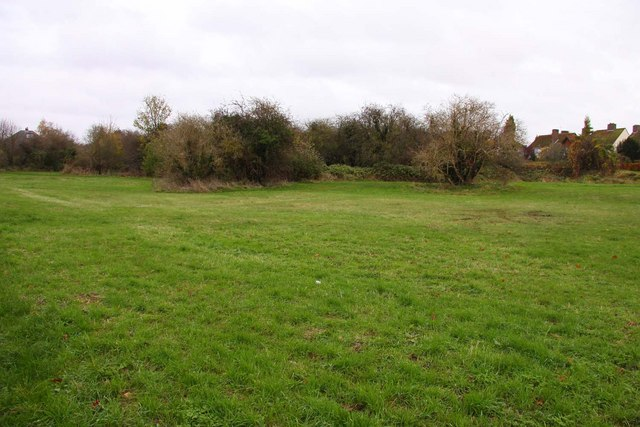
- Interactive map of Rock Edge Nature Reserve
- Location: Headington, Oxford, Oxfordshire, England
- Coordinates: 51°45′14″N 1°12′16″W
- Established: 1972

Rock Edge Nature Reserve is a small nature reserve and park in an area that was once a limestone quarry in Headington, east Oxford, England.

The local geology is made up of an old tropical coral reef, with coral outcrops surrounded by old sand bottom beds, similar to what is found in the waters around the Bahamas today. A small track leads meanders around the old quarry, where fossils of ancient marine creatures can still be found.

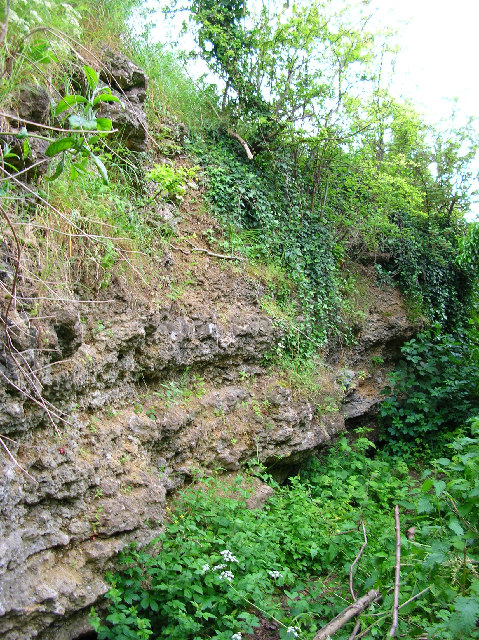
Old limestone quarry workings at Rock Edge Nature Reserve, near the junction of Old Road and Windmill Road

== Site of Special Scientific Interest ==
The Rock Edge quarry at the site is a Site of Special Scientific Interest (SSSI). The site covers 4 acres (1.6 hectares).

The site was formerly known as Crossroads Pit and has also been called Windmill Quarry since it was located just south of the main windmill in Headington. The name Cross Road Quarry has also been used.
