= Rory Collins =

British physician

Sir Rory Collins
- Born: Rory Edwards Collins; 3 January 1955 (age 71); Hong Kong
- Education: University of London; George Washington University; University of Oxford
- Known for: UK Biobank
- Awards: Knight Bachelor (2010); FMedSci (2004); FRS (2015)
- Scientific career
- Fields: Statins; Medicine; Meta-analysis; Myocardial infarction; Hypercholesterolemia
- Workplaces: University of Oxford
- Website: www.ndph.ox.ac.uk/team/rory-collins

Sir Rory Edwards Collins (born 3 January 1955) is a British physician who is professor of medicine and epidemiology at the Clinical Trial Service Unit within the University of Oxford, the head of the Nuffield Department of Population Health and a Fellow of Green Templeton College, Oxford. His work has been in the establishment of large-scale epidemiological studies of the causes, prevention and treatment of heart attacks, other vascular disease, and cancer, while also being closely involved in developing approaches to the combination of results from related studies ("meta-analyses"). Since September 2005, he has been the Principal Investigator and Chief Executive of the UK Biobank, a prospective study of 500,000 British people aged 40–69 at recruitment.

== Education ==
Collins was educated at Dulwich College and studied medicine at St Thomas's Hospital Medical School, part of the University of London (1974–1980), and Statistics at George Washington University from 1976 to 1977 and the University of Oxford from 1982 to 1983.

== Career and research ==
Since 1985, Collins has been co-director with Sir Richard Peto of the University of Oxford's Clinical Trial Services and Epidemiological Studies units. In 1996, he was appointed professor of medicine and epidemiology at Oxford, supported by the British Heart Foundation. Since September 2005, he has also been acting as the Principal Investigator and Chief Executive of the UK Biobank, a prospective study of 500,000 British people, aged 40–69 at recruitment.

Collins' work has been in the establishment of large-scale epidemiological studies of the causes, prevention and treatment of heart attacks, other vascular disease, and cancer.

He has created and led large studies that transformed statins from esoteric drugs for familial hypercholesterolaemia into widely-used generics that prevent millions of heart attacks and ischaemic strokes annually. His large placebo-controlled trials and worldwide Cholesterol Treatment Trialists' meta-analyses confirmed that statins reduce the risk of heart attack, discovered that they reduce the risk of stroke, and demonstrated their safety and efficacy in many different types of patient. His research has been funded by the Medical Research Council (MRC).

== Awards and honours ==
Collins was knighted in the 2011 New Year Honours for services to science. He was elected as a Fellow of the Academy of Medical Sciences in 2004 and a Fellow of the Royal Society (FRS) in 2015. Collins was included in Time's 2024 list of 100 most influential people in health.
