= Old Road Campus =

Oxford University Research Campus

Coordinates: 51.752530°N 1.215219°W

General view of the Old Road Campus including the Richard Doll Building in the distance

The Richard Doll Building on the Old Road Campus

The Old Road Campus is a University of Oxford site south of Old Road, in Headington, east Oxford, England. The Churchill Hospital, a teaching hospital managed by the Oxford University Hospitals NHS Foundation Trust, is to the south.

== Facilities ==
=== Medicine ===
The site is largely dedicated to medicine and includes the following:

- Kennedy Institute of Rheumatology
- NDM (Nuffield Department of Medicine) Research Building
  - Target Discovery Institute
  - Centre for Medicines Discovery (formerly the Structural Genomics Consortium - Oxford)
- Henry Wellcome Building for Genomic Medicine
- Henry Wellcome Building for Molecular Physiology
  - Offices of the Nuffield Professor of Medicine
- Henry Wellcome Building for Particle Imaging
- New Richards Building
  - Centre for Tropical Medicine and Global Health
- Nuffield Department of Population Health, Richard Doll Building
  - Cancer Epidemiology Unit
  - Clinical Trial Service Unit
  - National Perinatal Epidemiology Unit
- Big Data Institute (BDI)
- Medical Sciences Division (MSD) IT Services
- Old Road Campus Research Building
  - Department of Oncology
  - CRUK/MRC Oxford Institute for Radiation Oncology
  - Institute of Biomedical Engineering
  - Jenner Institute
  - Bodleian Knowledge Centre (Library Services)
  - Ludwig Institute for Cancer Research
  - Oxford Centre for Immuno-Oncology
  - Nuffield Department of Surgical Sciences
- Innovation Building

=== Other facilities ===
- Old Road Campus Estates Annexe
- Quad Offices
- Site Security Services
- Nursery
- Car Park
