= Big Data Institute =

Research institute at the University of Oxford

Coordinates: 51.752869°N 1.214906°W

Logo

The Big Data Institute (BDI), part of the Li Ka Shing Centre for Health Information and Discovery, is an interdisciplinary research institute at the University of Oxford. The institute brings together researchers from both the Nuffield Department of Population Health and the Nuffield Department of Medicine. The BDI building is on the Old Road Campus in Headington, east Oxford, England.

Academics from the BDI are advising the British government about a mobile phone app to track the COVID-19 pandemic in the United Kingdom.
