= Clinical Trial Service Unit =

Medical research institute at Oxford University

The Richard Doll Building, which houses the Clinical Trial Service Unit

The Clinical Trial Service Unit (CTSU) is a medical research institute within the Nuffield Department of Population Health at Oxford University. It primarily conducts large scale clinical trials (phase III – Final Testing) and epidemiological studies of chronic diseases, especially cancer and vascular conditions. It is located in the Richard Doll Building (RDB) on the Old Road Campus, in Headington, Oxford, England.

== History ==
The unit developed from a research team originally formed by Richard Doll. It was founded in 1975 and is led by the joint co-directors Richard Peto and Rory Collins. In 2013, there were approximately 250 staff working directly within the unit at the Richard Doll Building and many hundreds more at satellite centres around the world.

== Major projects ==
Major clinical trials run by the CTSU include Isis, the Heart Protection Study, Search and Sharp. The unit has also played key roles in the Kadoorie Study of Chronic Disease and the UK Biobank project.
