= L. Adrienne Cupples =

American epidemiologist (c. 1945 – 2022)

- Born: Laura Adrienne Sherrill; September 3, 1944; Gardner, MA, USA
- Died: January 13, 2022 (aged 78); Boston, MA, USA
- Citizenship: United States
- Education: Boston University; University of the Pacific (United States)
- Spouse: The Rev. John Cupples
- Children: 2 daughters
- Parents: Rev. Shirley Sherrill (father); Mary Lea Sherrill (mother)
- Scientific career
- Workplaces: Boston University

L. Adrienne Cupples (born Laura Adrienne Sherrill; September 3, 1944 – January 13, 2022) was a professor of epidemiology and biostatistics at the Boston University School of Public Health.

== Early life and education ==
Cupples was born to Rev. Shirley Sherrill and his wife, Mary Lea Sherrill. She studied history and American studies at Raymond College, part of the University of the Pacific (United States) in Stockton, California before earning a masters and doctorate in statistics from Boston University.

== Academic career ==
Cupples worked as a researcher on the Framingham Heart Study for over 35 years, eventually becoming the Co-Principal Investigator and a highly-cited researchers according to webometrics.

== Selected publications ==
- Go, Alan S.; Mozaffarian, Dariush; Roger, Véronique L.; Benjamin, Emelia J.; Berry, Jarett D.; Blaha, Michael J.; Dai, Shifan; Ford, Earl S.; et al. (2014-01-21). "Heart Disease and Stroke Statistics—2014 Update: A Report From the American Heart Association". Circulation. 129 (3): e28–e292. doi:10.1161/01.cir.0000441139.02102.80. ISSN 0009-7322. PMC 5408159. PMID 24352519.
- Farrer, Lindsay A.; Cupples, L Adrienne; Haines, Jonathan L.; et al. (1997-10-22). "Effects of Age, Sex, and Ethnicity on the Association Between Apolipoprotein E Genotype and Alzheimer Disease: A Meta-analysis". JAMA. 278 (16): 1349. doi:10.1001/jama.1997.03550160069041. ISSN 0098-7484.
- Locke, Adam E.; Kahali, Bratati; Berndt, Sonja I.; Justice, Anne E.; Pers, Tune H.; Day, Felix R.; Powell, Corey; Vedantam, Sailaja; et al. (February 2015). "Genetic studies of body mass index yield new insights for obesity biology". Nature. 518 (7538): 197–206. Bibcode:2015Natur.518..197.. doi:10.1038/nature14177. ISSN 1476-4687. PMC 4382211. PMID 25673413.
- Teslovich, Tanya M.; Musunuru, Kiran; Smith, Albert V.; Edmondson, Andrew C.; Stylianou, Ioannis M.; Koseki, Masahiro; Pirruccello, James P.; Ripatti, Samuli; et al. (August 2010). "Biological, clinical and population relevance of 95 loci for blood lipids". Nature. 466 (7307): 707–713. Bibcode:2010Natur.466..707T. doi:10.1038/nature09270. ISSN 1476-4687. PMC 3039276. PMID 20686565.
- Speliotes, Elizabeth K.; Willer, Cristen J.; Berndt, Sonja I.; Monda, Keri L.; Thorleifsson, Gudmar; Jackson, Anne U.; Allen, Hana Lango; Lindgren, Cecilia M.; et al. (November 2010). "Association analyses of 249,796 individuals reveal 18 new loci associated with body mass index". Nature Genetics. 42 (11): 937–948. doi:10.1038/ng.686. ISSN 1546-1718. PMC 3014648. PMID 20935630.
