= Our Future Health =

British large-scale health project

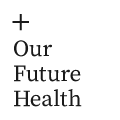

Our Future Health is a British health research project which aims to recruit 5 million people "to develop new ways to prevent, detect and treat diseases". It is a registered charity in England and Wales and in Scotland, and a private limited company. The charity and company were originally known as Early Disease Detection Research Project UK (EDRP UK) and the project as Accelerating Detection of Disease (ADD).

The project aims to improve the early diagnosis and treatment of diseases. The project chair, Sir John Bell, said that the project aims "to try and create a sandbox for testing and evaluating these early diagnostic or prevention strategies across a large population of people ... And we'll be able to use that population to help us evaluate these new tools, diagnose disease early, prevent disease more effectively, and intervene at an earlier stage".

Participation in the project is open to anyone aged over 18 and living in the United Kingdom. Participants are asked to complete a questionnaire about their health and lifestyle, and to attend a clinic to give a blood sample and have physical measurements taken. Clinics to enrol people into the project and take the initial blood sample were set up at venues including university campuses and branches of Boots, and people taking part in NHS Blood and Transplant may also choose to enrol.

De-identified data and samples provided by participants are shared with approved researchers at universities and in industry. Part of each blood sample is used for DNA analysis, with the results stored in the participant's record; the project may also use SNP array and genomic sequencing methods. Specific genetic data, linked to the individual, may be shared with NHS Blood and Transplant.

Participation continues throughout the individual's lifetime and after their death but volunteers may withdraw from the project at any time. As well as providing samples and personal data from questionnaires, surveys and feedback, participants agree to allow the project to access their present and future records held by the NHS.

The project has the support of the government, the life sciences industry, the NHS, and charities such as Alzheimer's Society, British Heart Foundation, and Cancer Research UK. £79 million was provided by the UK government via the UK Research and Innovation body, and in early 2022 a further £100 million was expected from the life sciences industry.

Recruitment to the study began in late 2022. In November 2023, it was announced that Our Future Health had recruited 1 million volunteers. The same month it was announced that data on the first 100,000 volunteers suggested that "Most adults in the UK should be receiving treatment for high cholesterol but are not, while a quarter have untreated high blood pressure". In October 2024 it was announced that 1 million volunteers had given blood samples. Raghib Ali, the CEO of Future Health, said "We can now say that Our Future Health is the world's largest health research programme of its kind. No other programme has collected this many blood samples for long-term research."

In 2025 Our Future Health shared that the data was being used to investigate the impact of E-Cigarettes in non-smokers, exploring the possibility of genetic risk factors for cardiometabolic disease, and analysing the genetic data linked to immune dysfunction.

== See also ==
- UK Biobank, a similar project
