= Nuffield Department of Population Health, University of Oxford =

UK academic institution

Department of Population Health
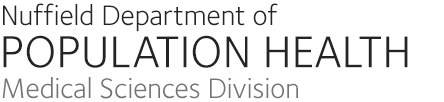
- Established: 2013
- Head of Department: Prabhat Jha
- Academic staff: 500
- Postgraduates: 184
- Location: Oxford, UK
- Website: www.ndph.ox.ac.uk

The Nuffield Department of Population Health (NDPH) is an academic department of the Medical Sciences Division at the University of Oxford. It is located at the Old Road Campus in Headington, Oxford, England, United Kingdom.

The head of department is Prof. Prabhat Jha who took over from the founding head of department Rory Collins in 2025.

== History ==
Richard Doll Building, which hosts the NDPH main offices and research teams including the Clinical Trial Service Unit

The Nuffield Department of Population Health was formed from the merger of eleven research units in the Medical Sciences Division in 2013, the majority of which were in the Department of Public Health which ceased to exist. These centres were the Cancer Epidemiology Unit (CEU); Centre for Health, Law and Emerging Technologies (HeLEX); Centre on Population Approaches for Non Communicable Disease Prevention (CPNP); Clinical Trial Service Unit (CTSU); the Ethox Centre; Health Economics Research Centre (HERC); Health Services Research Unit (HSRU); Unit of Health-Care Epidemiology (UHCE), Medical Careers Research Group (MCRG); Medical Research Council Population Health Research Unit (MRC PHRU); and the National Perinatal Epidemiology Unit (NPEU). The department is named for Viscount Nuffield, a major benefactor in establishing medical sciences at the university in the 1930s.

== Research ==
Research has focused on a broad range of public health science including the benefits of reducing meat intake, the efficacy of statins, and women's health through the Million Women Study. NDPH researchers, Michael Parker and Sara Wordsworth, contributed to Chief Medical Officer Sally Davies' 2016 annual report on genomics in health care systems.

There are over 500 research staff within NDPH.

== Buildings ==
The department is based in two buildings on the Old Road Campus in Headington, Oxford:

- The Richard Doll Building (main building)
- The Big Data Institute (BDI)

The Big Data Institute opened in 2017 as a collaboration between NDPH and the Nuffield Department of Medicine. The BDI hosts the NDPH research groups Ethox and the Medical Research Council Population Health Research Unit.
