= UEA School of Biological Sciences =

Department of University of East Anglia faculty of science

The School of Biological Sciences is a research-led academic community at the University of East Anglia. It works with partners in industry on a range of activities, including translating research discoveries into products, making knowledge and research expertise available through consultancies, contract research and provision of analytical services, as well as partnering industry in training both undergraduate and postgraduate students.

== Research ==
Across the RAE 2008 assessment period (7 years), the School won £38.5 million in peer-reviewed, competitive grant funding, representing an annual external funding rate of almost £5 million. Over 90% of research income is won from the UK Research Councils, the EU, or research charities.

Research in the School of Biological Sciences also has links with national organisations such as the Centre for Environment, Fisheries and Aquacultural Science, the Public Health Laboratory Service, and connections to international organisations as diverse as the US Department of Energy, the Norwegian Institute for Nature Research, and Birdlife International.

Research is split into 3 major themes:

- The Cells and Tissues theme focuses on understanding tissue specification and function in health and disease. A multidisciplinary approach is taken to define mechanisms that direct development and tissue maintenance and the role environmental factors play in the pathogenesis of disease. Strengths in cell and developmental biology, extracellular matrix and pericellular protease research and medically oriented studies of human diseases provide a basis to improve therapeutic manipulations in translational research.
- The Molecules and Pathways theme has broad interests which address many aspects of the fundamental molecular properties of biological phenomena. These range from the molecular structural biology of metallo-enzymes, through to the role of lipids in the pathogenic properties of trypanosomes.
- The Organisms and the Environment theme investigates an array of basic and strategic questions in evolutionary biology, organismic biology, ecology and biodiversity conservation using a combination of field and laboratory studies on a range of animal and plant taxa. Emphasis is placed on understanding specific adaptations simultaneously at the gene and whole-organism level, and on applying sound basic scientific principles to tackling pressing questions in conservation and applied biology.

== Facilities ==
- Norwich Research Park (NRP) is a collaboration between the University of East Anglia, the Norfolk and Norwich University Hospital, and four research centres; the John Innes Centre, the Institute of Food Research, the Sainsbury Laboratory and the Genome Analysis Centre. The NRP is also home to over 30 science and IT based companies.
- The Biomedical Research Centre (BMRC) was established using funds from the Wellcome Trust and the Wolfson Foundation. It provides lab space for over 100 scientists from the Schools of Biological Sciences, Medicine and Pharmacy. Areas of research include: cancer, arthritis, atherosclerosis, diet and health, type II diabetes, cardiomyopathy, deafness, muscular dystrophy, and aspects of viral, parasitic and bacterial infection. The BMRC's Disease Modelling Unit uses model systems to study the function of genes involved in human disease. It has a containment Level 3 laboratory for handling pathogenic organisms.
- The George Duncan Teaching Laboratories are equipped with interactive workstations for up to 160 students. Each workstation has a high definition plasma screen enabling students to view live or recorded material from any portable device within the lab, such as digital microscope cameras or laptop computers.
- The Henry Wellcome Laboratory for Cell Imaging was funded from the Joint Infrastructure Fund administered by The Wellcome Trust with contributions from the Higher Education Funding Council for England (HEFCE) and the Medical Research Council (MRC).
- The Plant Growth Facilities grow plants under controlled environmental conditions. These include high specification containment glasshouses which satisfy the requirements specified by the Department for Environment, Food and Rural Affairs (DEFRA) and the Health and Safety Executive (HSE) for the effective containment of transgenic plants and recombinant plant pathogens.
- The Sainsbury laboratory (TSL) is a charitable company that was set up in 1987 as a joint venture between the School of Biological Sciences, the Gatsby Charitable Foundation, the John Innes Foundation and BBSRC. It employs approximately 70 research scientists and support staff.
- The Wolfson Fermentation and Bioenergy Laboratory houses the university's Bacterial Growth and Downstream Processing Unit, a containment level 2 facility with large-scale bioreactors and processing facilities. It also houses a number of continuous culture bioreactors for use in post-genomic studies on microbial physiology.

== Teaching ==
The School of Biological Sciences offers 20 different full-time undergraduate degree programmes (plus three part-time degrees) in a wide range of subjects. Approximately 150 home and international students join each year for study leading to an Honours degree.

The School also offers five postgraduate master's degree programmes in; Applied Ecology and Conservation, Plant Genetics, Crop Improvement, Biotechnology for a Sustainable Future, Sustainable Agriculture and Food Security and Molecular Medicine.

== Notable alumni ==
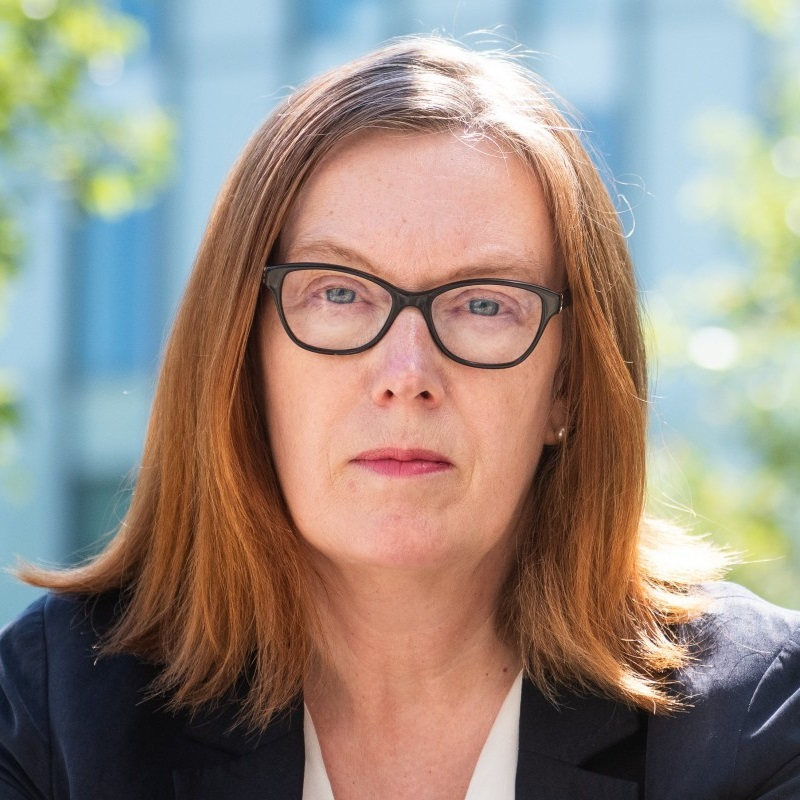
Dame Sarah Gilbert was the Project Lead on the Oxford–AstraZeneca COVID-19 vaccine

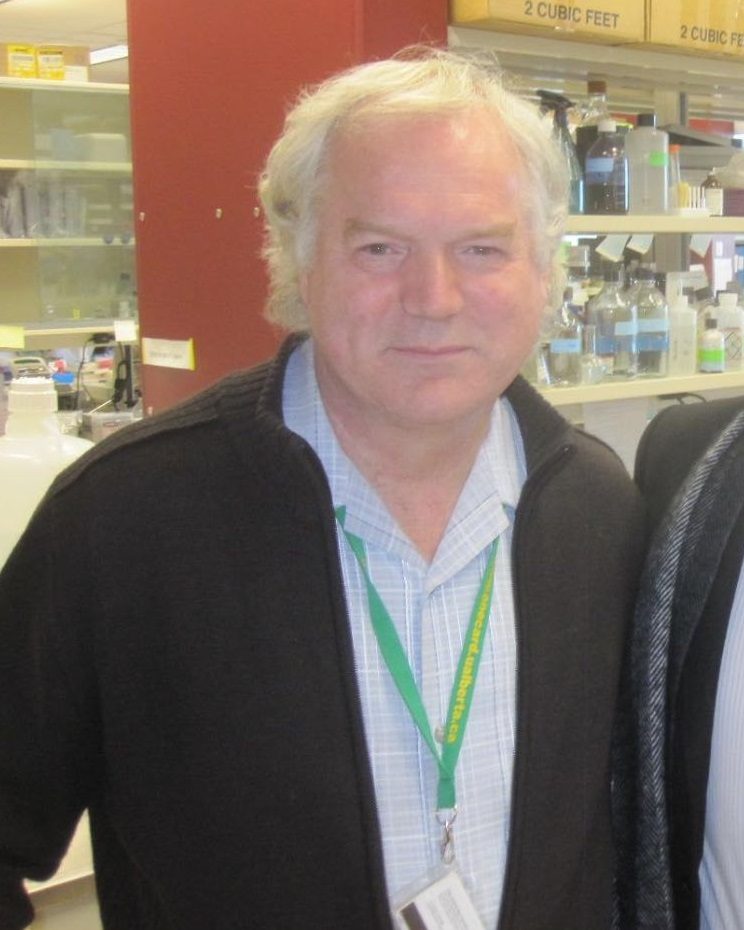
Nobel laureate and co-discoverer of Hepatitis C Sir Michael Houghton

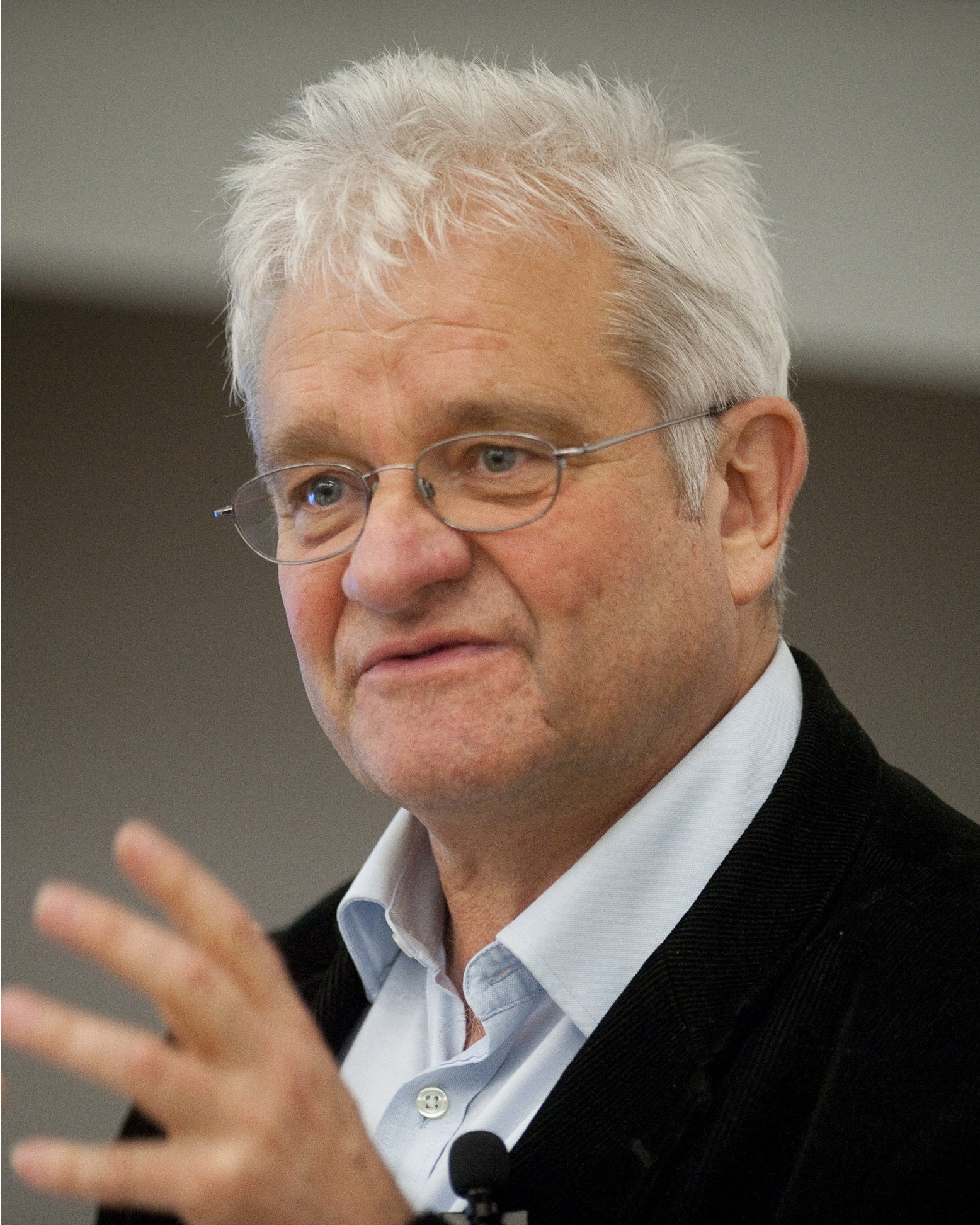
Nobel laureate and President of the Royal Society Sir Paul Nurse

- James Barber, Professor of Biochemistry at Imperial College London
- Nick Barton, Darwin Medal, Darwin–Wallace Medal and Erwin Schrödinger Prize winning evolutionary biologist
- Sir John Beringer, Professor at the University of Bristol
- Mervyn Bibb, molecular microbiologist
- Robert Boutilier, lecturer in zoology at the University of Cambridge
- Keith Briffa, climatologist
- Dennis Brown, Professor of Medicine at Harvard Medical School
- Tony Carr, Director of the Genome Damage and Stability Centre at the University of Sussex
- Karen Duff, Potamkin Prize winning pathologist and Professor of Pathology and Cell Biology at Columbia University
- Audrey Elkington, Archdeacon of Bodmin
- Richard Flavell, Director of the John Innes Centre
- Daphrose Gahakwa, Rwandan Education Minister
- Dame Sarah Gilbert, Saïd Professor of Vaccinology at the University of Oxford and Project Lead on the Oxford–AstraZeneca COVID-19 vaccine
- Don Grierson, Professor at the University of Nottingham
- Brian Hemmings, Cloëtta Prize winning biochemist
- Sir Michael Houghton, 2020 Nobel Prize in Physiology or Medicine laureate and co-discoverer of Hepatitis C
- Jad Isaac, Director General of the Applied Research Institute–Jerusalem
- David Jones, Flavelle Medal winning biologist
- Jon Owen Jones, Labour Member of Parliament
- Dame Emily Lawson, head of the NHS COVID-19 vaccine programme
- Eddie Mbadiwe, Member of the Nigerian House of Representatives
- Nicholas Mills, Professor at the University of California, Berkeley
- Richard Nichols, Professor of Evolutionary Genetics at Queen Mary University of London
- Sir Paul Nurse PRS, 2001 Nobel Prize in Physiology or Medicine laureate and President of the Royal Society
- Giles Oldroyd, plant scientist
- Rolph Payet, Seychellois Cabinet Minister
- Terence Rabbitts, Colworth Medal winning molecular biologist
- Michael G. Ritchie, evolutionary biologist
- Richard Sandbrook, Director of the International Institute for Environment and Development
- Össur Skarphéðinsson, Icelandic Foreign Minister
- Alexander Smith, CEO of Pier 1 Imports
- Nicola Stonehouse, Professor in Molecular Virology at the University of Leeds
- Nick Talbot, Professor at the University of Exeter
- Simon Thrush, Director of the Institute of Marine Science at the University of Auckland
- Amarilis de Varennes, President of the Instituto Superior de Agronomia
- Paul Wellings, Vice-Chancellor of the University of Wollongong and the University of Lancaster
- Christopher Wood, Miroslaw Romanowski Medal winning biologist

== Notable faculty ==
- Michael Balls, zoologist
- Sir David Baulcombe, plant scientist and geneticist
- Thomas Bennet-Clark, biologist
- Enrico Coen, plant biologist
- Tony Dixon, ecologist
- Ian Gibson, Labour Member of Parliament
- Godfrey Hewitt, evolutionary geneticist
- Sir David Hopwood, microbiologist and geneticist
- Jonathan Jones, geneticist
- John Alwyne Kitching, biologist
- Roy Markham, plant pathologist
- Bernat Soria, Spanish Health Minister
