= Alice Elizabeth Gairdner =

British plant scientist, geneticist and cytologist

- Born: 1873
- Died: 1954 (aged 80–81)
- Scientific career
- Fields: Botany, genetics, cytology
- Institutions: John Innes Horticultural Institution

Alice Elizabeth Gairdner (1873–1954) was a British plant scientist, geneticist and cytologist.

== Life ==
In the 1910s, Gairdner was associated with the Plant Breeding Institute in Cambridge and became one of William Bateson's Mendelian followers. In Cambridge she studied Tropaeolum (Nasturtium) and this work interested Bateson – he had numerous drawings and figures of Tropaeolum by Gairdner in his collection.

Gairdner joined the John Innes Horticultural Institution (now the John Innes Centre) in 1919 as a student, joining the so-called 'Ladies Lab' along with Caroline Pellew, Dorothea De Winton, Dorothy Cayley, Aslaug Sverdrup and Irma Andersson-Kottö. Gairdner investigated male sterility in flax, initially with Bateson, and continued the work after his death. In papers published in 1921 and 1929, they proposed that nuclear-cytoplasmic interactions may be causing the male sterility phenotype. Gairdner primarily worked with J. B. S. Haldane, who led the genetics research at the institution from 1927 to 1937, following Bateson's death in 1926. By 1929, Gairdner had been appointed as a "cytologist", as her work combined genetic analysis with microscopy. With Haldane, she studied the genetics of Antirrhinum, leading to the publication of two papers in 1929 and 1933 on the inheritance of two linked factors that could interact to produce a lethal phenotype. These papers indicate that Gairdner was solely responsible for the practical work (continuing crosses set up by her predecessor, Ida Sutton), and Haldane for the theoretical interpretation. She also studied Cleiranthus, and collaborated with Haldane and Rose Scott-Moncrieff in the investigation of pigmentation in the flowers. Gairdner also published several articles with Cyril Darlington describing chromosome pairing and ring formation during meiosis in Campanula. Gairdner presented the work on ring formation in Campanula at the Genetics Society meeting in 1936.
