= Dorothea De Winton =

Plant scientist

- Born: 1891
- Died: 1982 (aged 90–91)
- Known for: Linkage studies in Primula
- Scientific career
- Fields: Plant genetics
- Institutions: John Innes Horticultural Institute

Dorothea De Winton (1891–1982) was a plant scientist and one of the first female geneticists. She worked at the John Innes Horticultural Institution (now the John Innes Centre) for over 20 years.

== Life ==
De Winton worked as a professional gardener from 1916 until 1919, before approaching William Bateson with an interest in studying plants in a more scientific manner. She thus became one of the 'Bateson Ladies' at the John Innes Horticultural Institution in 1920, joining Caroline Pellew, Dorothy Cayley, Alice Gairdner, Aslaug Sverdrup and Irma Andersson in the so-called 'Ladies Lab'. From 1920 until 1926, De Winton worked with Bateson on Chinese primrose (Primula sinensis), continuing the work of Reginald Gregory. During this time period, in 1923, she co-authored 'Genetics of Primula sinensis', describing linkage studies for numerous traits in Primula sinensis. While in the 'Ladies Lab', De Winton also worked on genetic linkage in Pisum with Caroline Pellew, and the two women presented their studies at the International Congress of Genetics in Berlin in 1927.

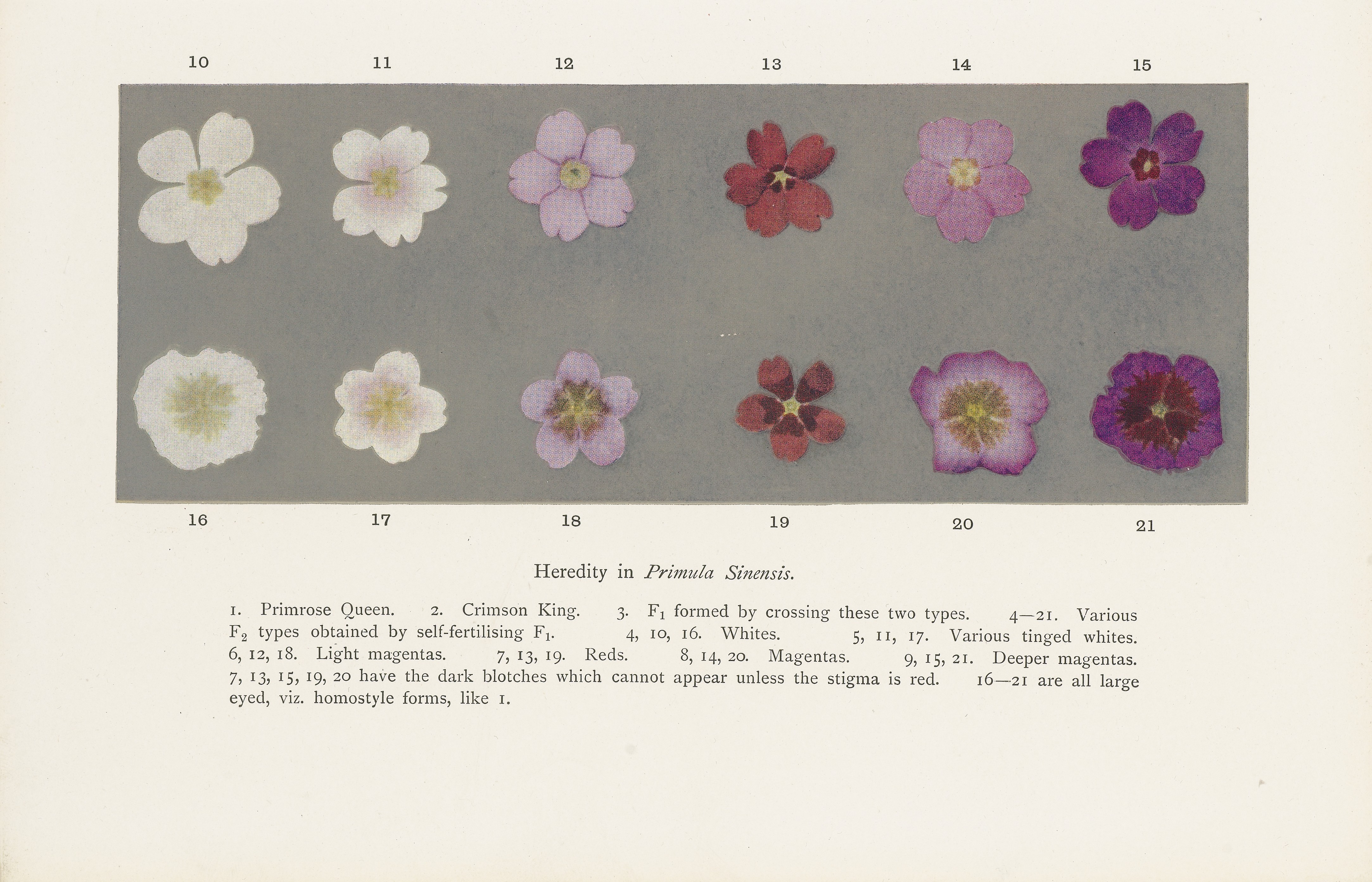
Diagram of heredity in Primula sinensis from a study published by William Bateson in 1909

From 1927, De Winton worked closely with the geneticist J. B. S. Haldane. She continued her work on Primula, resulting in the discovery of 20 new mutants and further publications on primrose genetics. In 1929, De Winton was officially named a geneticist at the John Innes Horticultural Institution. In 1932 De Winton published a book on her work titled 'Leaf and Bract Forms of Primula Sinensis and their Inheritance', following that with 'The Genetics of Primula sinensis: IV. Indications as to the Ontogenetic Relationship of Leaf and Inflorescence' with Edgar Anderson in 1935. She also published a study on self-sterility and self-fertility in Nicotiana with Anderson in 1931.

De Winton left the John Innes Horticultural Institution in 1941, following the appointment of Cyril Darlington as the director of the institute in 1939. Changes made by Darlington resulted in a reduction in her pay which she found unacceptable, resulting in her resignation (together with Caroline Pellew). Following this, De Winton worked at Messrs Ballard in Worcestershire as a plant breeder.

Dorothea De Winton died in 1982.

In 2019, the Dorothea De Winton Field Station was opened at the John Innes Centre.
