= Caroline Pellew =

British botanist

- Born: 1882; Brighton, Sussex, England
- Died: 1963 (aged 80–81); Hitchin, Hertfordshire, England
- Education: John Innes Centre, University College Reading (now University of Reading)
- Known for: Cytological Studies on the Relations Between Asiatic and European Varieties of Pisum Sativum
- Scientific career
- Fields: Genetics
- Academic advisors: Frederick Keeble, William Bateson

Caroline Pellew (1882--1963) was a British geneticist who made significant contributions to knowledge of the laws of inheritance in various organisms including peas.

== Education ==
Pellew was awarded the first minor studentship at the John Innes Centre in 1910. She was a Horticultural Associate of University College Reading and completed a two-year diploma course in horticulture. While at Reading she worked with the botany professor, Frederick Keeble, to investigate the genetics in the chemistry of flower colour.

== Research and Writing ==
Pellew conducted much of her significant work on the "rogue" phenomenon in peas with William Bateson and became known as "Professor Bateson's right-hand man", or alternatively his "lieutenant, secretary, mentor and foil". She headed the researchers at Merton after Bateson's death, including fellow female geneticists; Dorothea de Winton, Dorothy Caley, Alice Gairdner, Irma Anderson-Kotto and Aslaug Sverdrup.

By 1929, Pellew had proved her passion for genetics and was given the title of ‘geneticist’ and meticulously worked with peas for over 20 years.

In 1941, Pellew was forced to take "voluntary retirement" due to John Innes experiencing a reduction in income because of the war.

Pellew wrote many papers on Pisum (peas) and Primula (Primrose) and in 1931 published a book called Genetical and Cytological Studies on the Relations Between Asiatic and European Varieties of Pisum Sativum. In 1946, she wrote to J. B. S. Haldane to belatedly congratulate him on his marriage, explaining that her letter was late because she was "sacrificing letter writing to peas."
