= Keith Chater =

British microbiologist

Keith Frederick Chater FRS (born 23 April 1944) is a British microbiologist, formerly head of the departments of Genetics and Molecular Microbiology at the John Innes Centre. He has held honorary professorships at the University of East Anglia, Huazhong Agricultural University, and the Chinese Academy of Sciences Institute of Microbiology.

== Career ==
Chater studied for a PhD at the University of Birmingham working on the genetics of methionine biosynthesis in Salmonella.

== Career and research ==
He joined the John Innes Centre in 1969 and began working with David Hopwood. His group studied the complex life cycle of Streptomyces, and developed bacteriophage ɸC31 - based cloning vectors used to isolate Streptomyces genes. He was also involved in comparative genomics of Streptomyces.
