= Anne Edwards (disambiguation) =

Anne Edwards (1927–2024) was an American author.

Anne Edwards may also refer to:

- Anne Edwards (politician) (1935–2022), Canadian politician
- Anne Edwards (botanist), British plant scientist
- Anne M. Edwards, screenwriter of Minor Details
- Mihi Edwards (1918–2008), New Zealand writer, social worker, teacher and kaumātua (respected Māori elder), known as Anne Edwards until the 1960s

== See also ==
- Annie Edwards (c. 1830–1896), English novelist
- Anna Edwards (disambiguation)
- Edwards (surname)
