= John Kitching =

John Kitching may refer to:

- John Kitching (athlete), British high jump competitor in the 1950s
- John Alwyne Kitching (1908–1996), British biologist
- John Howard Kitching (1838–1865), Union army officer during the American Civil War
- John Kitching (physicist) at NIST, Fellow of the American Physical Society

== See also ==
- Jack Kitching, English professional rugby league footballer in the 1940s
