= Anna Edwards =

Anna Edwards may refer to:

- Anna Edwards (equestrian) (born 1984), British equestrian
- Anna Cheney Edwards (1835–1930), American educator
- Anna Leonowens (1831–1915), née Edwards, travel writer, educator and social activist

== See also ==
- Anne Edwards (disambiguation)
- Annie Edwards (c. 1830–1896), English novelist
