= Michael Gale =

Michael Gale may refer to:

- Michael Gale (footballer), Australian rules footballer
- Michael Denis Gale, British plant geneticist
- Mike Gale, American basketball player
- Bob Gale (Michael Robert Gale), American screenwriter, producer and film director
