= Myriam Charpentier =

British molecular biologist

- Education: LMU Munich
- Scientific career
- Fields: Molecular Biology
- Workplaces: John Innes Centre

Myriam Charpentier is a molecular biologist, who specialises in cell and developmental biology at the John Innes Centre, Norwich. Charpentier studies the environmental and biological stimulus of nuclear calcium signalling in plants.

She obtained her PhD in Plant Molecular Biology from LMU Munich. Following this, Charpentier joined the John Innes Centre in 2009, and became a David Philips fellow and group leader in 2017.

Charpentier investigates what produces calcium oscillations and how calcium channels affect plant development and has published extensively on this topic. Nuclear calcium machinery is common to all land plants, her laboratory is exploring how this has evolved and functions across different species. Dr. Charpentier has also published on topics including the dynamic organisation of the nucleus, and on legume symbiosis and nitrogen fixation.

Charpentier's work with Giles Oldroyd led to the discovery of cyclic nucleotide–gated ion channel 15s (CNGS15s). These proteins are key in the process to move calcium into the nucleus, an important part of the signal to the plant that nitrogen-fixing bacteria are in the soil nearby.

More recently, in 2019, Charpentier's group discovered that nuclear calcium signalling plays another important role in plant roots, besides symbiosis. Her team showed that calcium can be released by the nucleus of root apical meristem – the region of the growing root. Using genetic approaches, the team could modulate nuclear calcium signatures to obtain longer or shorter roots in the model organism Arabidopsis thaliana.
