= Woolhouse =

Woolhouse is a surname. Notable people with the surname include:

- Daniel Woolhouse, professional Drifting driver from New Zealand
- Harold Woolhouse (1932–1996), British botanist
- Mark Woolhouse (born 1959), Professor of Epidemiology, University of Edinburgh
- Wesley S. B. Woolhouse (1809–1893), English actuary
- William Woolhouse (1791–1837), English cricketer
