= Deng Zixin =

Chinese microbiologist (born 1957)

- Born: 1957 (age 68–69); Hubei, China
- Education: Huazhong Agricultural University; University of East Anglia
- Scientific career
- Fields: Microbiology
- Workplaces: Shanghai Jiao Tong University; Wuhan University; Huazhong Agricultural University
- Thesis: A molecular study of a region of the Streptomyces plasmid pIJ101 (1987)
- Doctoral advisor: David Hopwood and Tobias Kieser

Deng Zixin (Chinese: 邓子新; born 1957) is a Chinese microbiologist and Professor of Microbiology at Shanghai Jiao Tong University.

Born in Hubei, China, he graduated from Huazhong Agricultural University with a BSc in microbiology in 1982 and completed his PhD on the genetics of Streptomyces at the University of East Anglia in 1987. He was made a Member of the Chinese Academy of Sciences in 2005, a Fellow of The World Academy of Sciences in 2006, and a Fellow of the American Academy of Microbiology in 2010. He was elected a Fellow of the Royal Society of Chemistry in 2019. He is currently the dean of School of Pharmacy at Wuhan University and director of Wuhan Institute of Biotechnology.
