= Shan Yang =

Chinese engineer

- 单杨
- Born: 13 February 1963 (age 63); You County, Hunan, China
- Education: Huazhong Agricultural University
- Scientific career
- Fields: Food biotechnology
- Workplaces: Hunan Academy of Agricultural Sciences

Chinese name
- Simplified Chinese: 单杨
- Traditional Chinese: 單楊
Transcriptions
Standard Mandarin
- Hanyu Pinyin: Shàn Yáng

Shan Yang (born 13 February 1963) is a Chinese engineer who is president and deputy party secretary of Hunan Academy of Agricultural Sciences, and an academician of the Chinese Academy of Engineering.

== Biography ==
Shan was born in You County, Hunan, on 13 February 1963. He graduated from Huazhong Agricultural University in July 1984. In 1986, the Communist government sent him to study at the Institute of Agricultural Chemistry and Food Technology, National Research Council of Spain. In May 2020, he rose to become president and Chinese Communist Party Deputy Committee Secretary of Hunan Academy of Agricultural Sciences.

== Honours and awards ==
- 18 November 2021 Member of the Chinese Academy of Engineering (CAE)
