= Yiliang Ding =

Chinese scientist

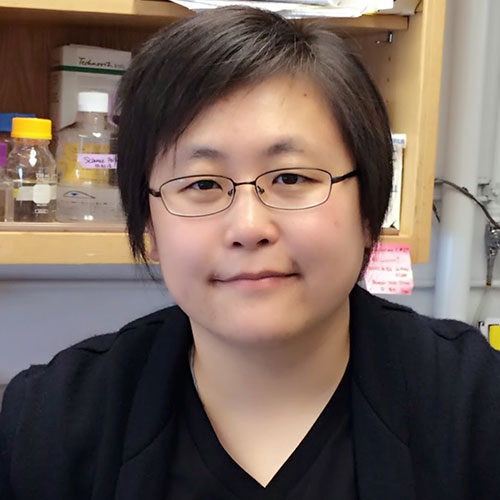
- Born: September 8, 1982
- Education: Shanghai Jiao Tong University; University of East Anglia
- Scientific career
- Fields: RNA Biology; RNA Structure; Plant Biology; Artificial Intelligence
- Institutions: John Innes Centre Babraham Institute University of East Anglia
- Doctoral advisor: Giles Oldroyd
- Website: www.jic.ac.uk/people/yilliang-ding

Professor Yiliang Ding is a Chinese scientist and group leader at the John Innes Centre since 2014, where her research focuses on the functional roles of the RNA structure in living cells. She has also been an Honorary Group Leader at the Babraham Institute and an Honorary Professor at the University of East Anglia since 2024.

== Career and research ==
Yiliang received her bachelor’s degree from Shanghai Jiao Tong University in 2005 and completed her PhD in 2009 at the John Innes Centre under the supervision of Prof. Giles Oldroyd FRS. She subsequently spent two months as a visiting researcher in the laboratory of Prof. David Lilley (biochemist) FRS at the University of Dundee between November and December 2009. Prior to her move to the John Innes Centre as a group leader, Yiliang worked as a Postdoctoral Scholar at Penn State University, where she worked on the structural folding of RNA under the Human Frontier Science Program Grant from 2010 to 2013. Yiliang obtained the David Phillips Fellowship and started her own group at the John Innes Centre in 2014. She was granted tenure at the John Innes Centre in 2019. Yiliang's group researches RNA structure and post-transcriptional regulation. Her group’s research focuses on understanding the dynamics of RNA structure in living cells. Yiliang develops new approaches for revealing in vivo RNA structurome. In particular her work on a high throughput method, Structure-seq, to resolve one of the first two genome-wide in vivo RNA structure maps, was published in Nature in 2013. This paper "In vivo genome-wide profiling of RNA secondary structure reveals novel regulatory features" has been widely cited as a method for in vivo RNA structural analysis.

Since 2014, Yiliang's group has been studying the functional roles of RNA structure in diverse biological processes such as mRNA processing (splicing and polyadenylation), phase separation, translation, and RNA degradation. Yiliang's group has also developed new methods to reveal the existence of tertiary RNA G-quadruplex structures in eukaryotes and uncovered that RNA G-quadruplex structure serves as a molecular marker to facilitate plant adaptation to the cold during evolution. Recently, Yiliang's group has developed the single-molecule RNA structure profiling method that is capable of dissecting individual RNA structure conformation in living cells for the first time. The group revealed the functional importance of RNA structure in long noncoding RNAs. Yiliang Ding is at the forefront of AI-driven RNA biology. Her group established a powerful RNA foundation model, PlantRNA-FM, that facilitates the explorations of functional RNA structure motifs across transcriptomes. She serves as an editorial board member for Nucleic Acids Research, Annual Review of Plant Biology and Genome Biology.

=== Awards and honours ===
In January 2024 Yiliang Ding was one of the nine recipients of the 2024 Blavatnik Awards for Young Scientists in the UK and is the first UK plant scientist to receive the award. She has also received several prestigious awards and grants, including the Biotechnology and Biological Sciences Research Council David Phillips Fellowship, the European Research Council Starting Grant, the European Research Council Consolidator Grant, the European Research Council Proof of Concept Grant, and the Royal Society Faraday Discovery Fellowships.
