= Dale Sanders =

British plant biologist (born 1953)

- Born: 13 May 1953 (age 73)
- Education: University of York (BA); Darwin College, Cambridge (PhD); University of Cambridge (DSc)
- Awards: FRS (2001)
- Scientific career
- Workplaces: John Innes Centre; University of York; Yale University
- Thesis: The regulation of ion transport in characean cells (1978)
- Website: www.jic.ac.uk/people/dale-sanders

Dale Sanders, FRS (born 13 May 1953) is a plant biologist and former Director of the John Innes Centre. The centre is an institute for research in plant sciences and microbiology, in Norwich, England.

== Education ==
Sanders was educated at The Hemel Hempstead School. He gained a Bachelor of Arts degree from the University of York reading Biology from 1971 to 1974, graduating with 1st Class Honours.

Sanders did his PhD alongside Professor Enid AC MacRobbie FRS at Darwin College, Cambridge in 1978, in the Department of Plant Sciences. In 1993, Sanders earned his Sc.D. from the University of Cambridge.

== Research ==
Sanders’ research explores the transport of ions across plant cell membranes and the roles of ions in signalling and nutrient status.

Sanders’ first significant finding during his PhD was to provide unequivocal evidence that inorganic anion uptake in plants is powered by a proton gradient and showed how transport is regulated through intracellular ion concentrations.

In subsequent research as a post-doc at Yale University School of Medicine he pioneered the first methods to measure and interpret the interplay between control of intracellular pH and activity of the plasma membrane proton pump. Showing how the regulation of the proton pump is controlled by – and in turn controls – intracellular pH. This work on a fungus served as a paradigm for understanding the interplay of membrane transport and cellular homeostasis in fungal and plant cells.

On taking an academic position at the University of York, Sanders developed novel electrophysiological approaches to plant cellular signalling and membrane transport.

The Sanders lab demonstrated a key link between changes in cytosolic free calcium and photosynthetic activity, and through many technical developments showed how membrane transport at the plant vacuole is energised and regulated in response to physiological demand.

Sanders also developed a unified mathematical theory that explained complex kinetics of solute uptake in plants, along with having created the first methodology to measure transient changes in intracellular calcium levels in higher plants, and discovered that light/dark changes in photosynthetic activity were highly dependent on cytosolic changes in calcium.

In the days before extensive molecular biology, Sanders discovered that the vacuolar proton pump of plants was essentially similar to mitochondrial ATPases. He also adapted electrophysiological techniques first developed for exploration of neuronal channel properties to determine that pumps at vacuolar membranes exhibit kinetic responses to ion gradients that would not be predicted through biochemical means. Parallel to this, he discovered that vacuolar membranes exhibit electrically-driven ion release.

Using both electrophysiological and biochemical approaches, Sanders was able to establish for the first time in plants that metabolites can act as triggers for release of calcium (a cellular signal) from vacuoles.

Sanders established principles for biofortification of cereal crops with essential human mineral nutrients, and molecularly characterised calcium permeable channels. Sanders also discovered and characterised the first (and only) yeast calcium channel and demonstrated how cell marking can be used to distinguish cell types for patch clamp studies.

Sanders also had influence in the investigation into the roles of plant cyclic nucleotide-gated channels that were explored at an early stage of discovery and resulted in a major collaborative publication with another lab demonstrating a key role in plant-bacterial symbiosis signalling.

On top of his extensive discoveries, he has also written influential reviews on calcium signalling in plants, which have 3,300 combined citations on Google Scholar.

To further his work on calcium channels, he then discovered that the TPC1 channel is the major pathway for ion exchange across plant vacuolar membranes. Their speculations that the TPC1 channel is involved in Calcium-induced calcium release were proven for the first time in plants in work from Sanders’ lab. He then established the principal molecular and cellular mechanisms for plant tolerance to manganese toxicity.

Sanders has discovered the major mechanism of zinc accumulation in plant vacuoles, and more recently characterised the molecular properties of the transporter and showed how the transporter could be used for nutritional benefit for human consumption of cereal grains. On top of further collaborating with a Chinese lab to establish more generally the important role of zinc nutrition in rice.

Sander’s current research focuses on how plant cells respond to changes in their environment and how they store the nutrients they acquire. In particular, his group work on how transport of chemical elements across cell membranes in plants is integrated with cellular signalling and nutritional status.

== Career ==
Sanders' research career began at the Yale University School of Medicine, first as a postdoctoral research fellow (1978–1979) and then as a postdoctoral research associate (1979–1983).

After a stint as a visiting research fellow in the University of Biological Sciences at the University of Sydney (1983), Sanders moved into the biology department at the University of York in 1983, first as a lecturer (1983–1989), a reader (1989–1992), a professor (1992–2010), also acting as the head of department (2004–2010).

In 2010 Sanders moved to the John Innes Centre, Norwich, as director and group leader, establishing new collaborations with the Chinese Academy of Sciences.

== Awards and honours ==
Sanders was elected a Fellow of the Royal Society in 2001.

Throughout his career Sanders has received a number of additional awards and honours, including:

- Fellowships: Inaugural Fellow of the Royal Society of Biology (2009)
- Elected to Royal Society Council (2004–2006)
- China International Science and Technology Cooperation Award (2021)
- Chinese Academy of Science (CAS) International Science and Technology Cooperation Award (2021)
- Royal Society/Leverhulme Trust Senior Research Fellowship (1997–1998)
- Nuffield Foundation Science Research Fellowship (1989–1990)
- James Hudson Brown Fellowship, Yale University (1979–1980)
- Prizes: Koerber Foundation European Science Prize (2001)
- President's Medal, Society for Experimental Biology (1987)
- Honorary Chairs: University of York (2010–present)
- University of East Anglia (2010–present)
- Agricultural Genomics Institute Shenzhen (2018–present)
