= Robert M. Goodman =

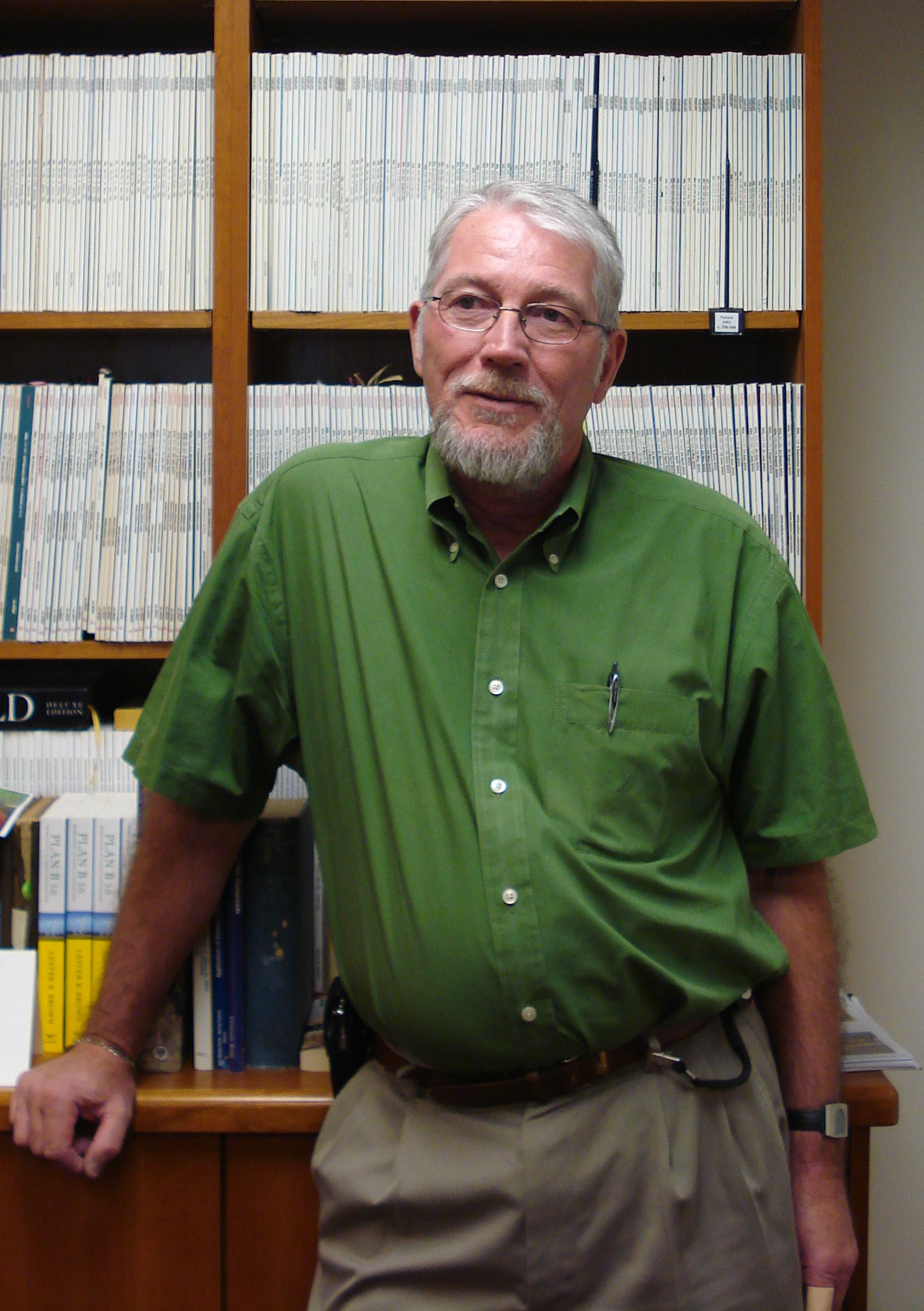
Robert Goodman, September 2008

Robert "Bob" M. Goodman (born December 30, 1945) is a prominent plant biologist and virologist, and served as the executive dean of agriculture and natural resources at Rutgers, The State University of New Jersey since June 2005. He was the executive dean of Rutgers School of Environmental and Biological Sciences and served as the executive director of Rutgers New Jersey Agricultural Experiment Station.

== Biography ==
Goodman was born in Ithaca, New York. After graduating from Trumansburg High School, he attended Johns Hopkins University before transferring to Cornell University, where he earned a Bachelor of Science (B.Sc.) in plant sciences and his Doctor of Philosophy (Ph.D.) in plant pathology. He then completed a postdoctoral fellowship in plant virology at the John Innes Centre in Norwich, England.

Goodman was a professor at the University of Illinois Urbana-Champaign from 1974 to 1982. He then joined Calgene, Inc., as executive vice-president of R&D. From 1990 to 1991, he served as senior scholar-in-residence at the National Research Council/National Academy of Sciences.

Immediately prior to assuming his decanal duties at Rutgers, Goodman was a professor of plant pathology and environmental studies at the University of Wisconsin–Madison. There, he studied microbial diversity using culture-independent methods. His group discovered a clade of soil Thermoproteota (formerly Crenarchaeota) inhabiting soil and plant roots, and characterized the diversity of uncultivated members of the bacterial division acidobacterium. He and collaborators also pioneered the field now known as "metagenomics." Goodman's work has appeared in premier journals, including Nature, Science, Virology, and the Proceedings of the National Academy of Sciences. Goodman also served as chair of the undergraduate major in molecular biology and as chair of the oversight committee of the McKnight Foundation Collaborative Crop Research Program.

Goodman was elected a fellow of the American Association for the Advancement of Science (AAAS) in 2002 and also chaired the Agriculture, Food and Renewable Resources section of the AAAS. He also served two terms as a trustee of the International Maize and Wheat Improvement Center (CIMMYT) and for many years was a member of the board of directors of the Cornell Research Foundation.
