= Xiaoqi Feng =

Chinese plant geneticist

Xiaoqi Feng is a Chinese plant geneticist, currently based at the Institute of Science and Technology Austria, Vienna, Austria. Previously (2014 - 2022), She was a professor at the John Innes Centre, Norwich, England.

As a Clarendon Fund scholar (2006 - 2010), Feng pursued her DPhil study at the University of Oxford where she won the Mendel Medal in the Biological and Biomedical Sciences category of the SET (science, engineering and technology) for Britain award, before moving to work as a postdoctoral researcher at the University of California, Berkeley in 2011. She remained at Berkeley until 2014 when she joined the John Innes Centre as a group leader.

In 2018, Feng was named one of 26 Young Investigators named by the European Molecular Biology Organization (EMBO).

Feng is currently researching epigenetic reprogramming in plant germlines and is credited with the discovery of 'immortal plant cells', which provide a reprogramming mechanism that allows plants to maintain fitness down the generations.
