= Aslaug Sverdrup Sømme =

Norwegian plant scientist and geneticist

- Born: 3 June 1891; Bergen
- Died: 9 April 1955 (aged 63)
- Education: University of Oslo
- Spouse: Iacob Dybwad Sømme
- Children: Lauritz Sømme
- Scientific career
- Fields: Genetics
- Workplaces: University of Oslo, John Innes Horticultural Institute
- Thesis: Genetics and cytology of the tetraploid form of Primula sinensis (1931)
- Academic advisors: Kristine Bonnevie

Aslaug Sverdrup Sømme (3 June 1891 – 9 April 1955) was a Norwegian plant scientist and geneticist.

== Life ==
Aslaug Sverdrup Sømme was born in 1891 in Bergen. Her father was Jakob Sverdrup, a bishop and politician, and her mother was Marie Bernardine Suur.

In 1910, Sømme enrolled at the University of Oslo's Institute for Genetic Research (Institut for Arvelighetsforskning) in Oslo, Norway. In 1918, she started a master's degree in zoology, studying plankton in the Oslofjord from the research station in Drøbak. During her degree, she was supervised by Kristine Bonnevie, the first female professor in Norway. From this research, Sømme published the study 'Plankton surveys from Kristianiafjorden. Hydromeduser' in 1921. By 1919 she was appointed as an assistant professor (amanuensis), becoming only the second women ever to hold a research position at the university. Sømme and Bonnevie published studies on polydactyly ('Postaxial polydactylism in six generations of a Norwegian family' in 1922), and twins ('Hereditary predisposition to dizygotic twin-births in Norwegian peasant families' in 1926).

Upon hearing of the growing work being done by William Bateson on genetics at the John Innes Horticultural Institute (now the John Innes Centre) in the UK, Sømme wrote to Bateson requesting to join him working on Primula sinensis, crossing the North Sea in 1921, initially as a volunteer. During her time working in the 'Ladies Lab' with other female geneticists including Caroline Pellew and Dorothea De Winton, Sømme studied Primula sinensis genetics and cytology. Sømme remained in England until 1926, at which point she returned to Norway to take up the position of lecturer in genetics at the University of Oslo. The research she conducted at the John Innes Horticultural Institute formed part of her doctoral dissertation, which was finished in 1931.

In 1929, Sverdrup married Iacob Dybwad Sømme, who she had met in 1925 in Drøbak. Together they had one son, Lauritz S. Sømme, who was born in 1931. In 1942, Iacob Dybwad Sømme was arrested for his participation in the Norwegian resistance movement to the Nazi occupiers. He was sentenced to death in 1944.

Following the arrest of Otto Lous Mohr, director of the institute at the time, by the Nazis in 1941, Sømme took charge of the board for the Institute of Genetic Research at the University of Oslo. She took over this position again in 1945 after Mohr became the rector of the university.

Sømme resigned from her post at the University of Oslo in 1950 and died in 1955.
