= Christopher John Lamb =

English biologist (1950–2009)

Chris Lamb FRS
- Born: Christopher John Lamb; 19 March 1950
- Died: 21 August 2009 (aged 59)
- Education: University of Cambridge
- Awards: Fellow of the Royal Society
- Scientific career
- Workplaces: University of Cambridge; University of Oxford; University of Edinburgh; University of East Anglia; John Innes Centre; Salk Institute for Biological Studies

Christopher John Lamb CBE FRS (19 March 1950 – 21 August 2009) was a Professor of Plant Biology at the University of East Anglia and director of the John Innes Centre.

His field of study was plant–pathogen interactions, and he made many contributions to the understanding of plant pathology.

== Education ==
Lamb graduated from Fitzwilliam College, Cambridge, with a Bachelor of Arts degree in natural sciences with first class honours in 1972, which was followed by a PhD in plant biochemistry in 1976, also from Cambridge.

== Career and research ==
From 1975 to 1982 he worked at the University of Oxford, first as an ICI Research Fellow in the School of Botany, then as a Browne Research Fellow at The Queen's College. In 1982 he moved to the Salk Institute for Biological Studies in La Jolla, California where he was director of the plant biology laboratory until 1998. In 1999 he returned to the United Kingdom, first at the University of Edinburgh where he was Regius Professor of Plant Science then at the University of East Anglia where he was a Professor and director of the John Innes Centre.
