= Graham Moore (scientist) =

British scientist

- Born: March 1958 (age 68)
- Awards: (1998) Royal Society Darwin Medal, with Michael D. Gale; (2018) Rank Prize for Nutrition, with Professor J. K. Edwards; (2024) Fellow of the Royal Society
- Scientific career
- Fields: Plant Science, Biology
- Workplaces: Plant Breeding Institute; John Innes Centre
- Website: https://www.jic.ac.uk/people/graham-moore/

Graham Moore FRS (born March 1958) is a British scientist, an internationally recognised researcher. He was the Director of the John Innes Centre, Norwich from 2022 to 2025. Most of his research has focused on understanding cereal genetics.

Professor Moore developed the pioneering concept of cereal 'Synteny', for which he was awarded the Royal Society Darwin Medal in 1998. His research provides an understanding of the control of pairing and crossover between related chromosomes in wheat and enables genes from wild relatives to be incorporated into the wheat genome.

His research aims to understand the genes involved in the temperature sensitivity of meiosis. In 2021 Professor Moore's research group characterised the gene, ZIP4, which has profound effects on the production of seeds in wheat. Professor Moore's group took advantage of new wheat research technology to explain genetic elements.

He is internationally recognised for his work, and in 2018 he was jointly awarded the Rank Prize for Nutrition for his contribution to pioneering research which enabled plant breeders to exploit genomics to develop improved wheat cultivars.

He coordinated the BBSRC-funded cross-institutional wheat programme, Designing Future Wheat, involving eight UK institutions from 2017 to 2023.

== Awards ==
- 1998 − The Royal Society Darwin Medal, jointly with Professor Michael Denis Gale.
- 2018 − Rank Prize for Nutrition, jointly with Professor Keith Edwards.
- 2024 – Elected Fellow of the Royal Society

== Works ==
- Cereal genome evolution: grasses, line up and form a circle. Graham Moore, KM Devos, Z Wang, MD Gale, 1995/7/1.
