= Kirsten Bomblies =

American biologist

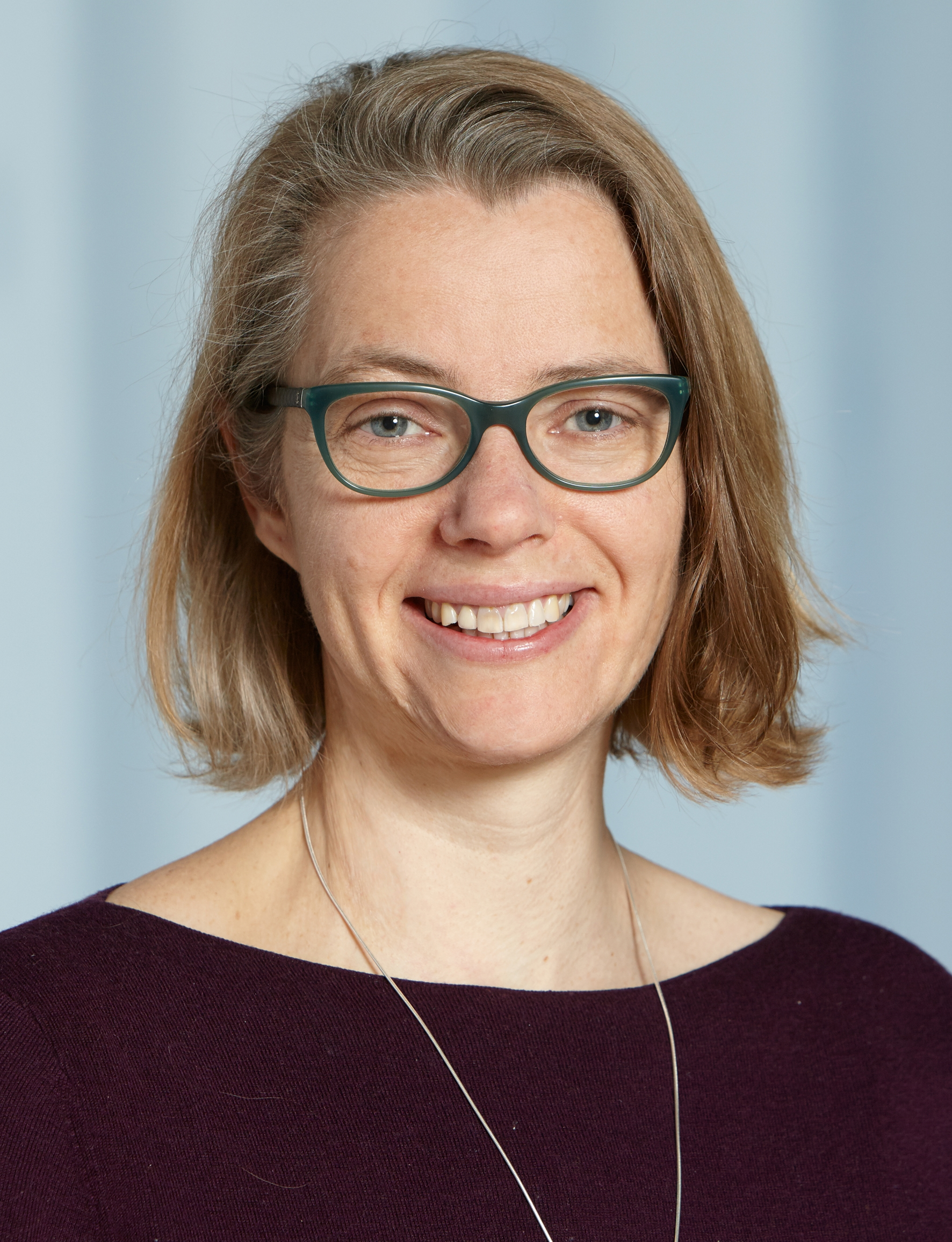
Kirsten Bomblies (2019)

Kirsten Bomblies is an American biological researcher. Her research focuses primarily on species in the Arabidopsis genus, particularly Arabidopsis arenosa. She has studied processes related to speciation and hybrid incompatibility, and currently focuses on the adaptive evolution of meiosis in response to climate and genome change.

== Early life and education ==
She was born in 1973 in Germany and grew up in Castle Rock, Colorado. She received her Bachelor of Arts in biochemistry and biology from The University of Pennsylvania in 1996.

== Career ==
Bomblies earned her PhD with John Doebley at the University of Wisconsin - Madison, studying extant domesticated Maize (called "Corn" colloquially in United States) with some study of Teosinte, its wild precursor. She examined how these plants as well as organisms in general develop to their extant form and function due to the influence of their component genes, proteins and other intrinsic and extrinsic forces.

As a postdoc with Detlef Weigel at the Max Planck Institute for Developmental Biology in Tübingen, Germany, she began to study how individuals interact with other organisms and to examine selection forces within and across species boundaries, accessions, chronological gradients and other delineations. The work has an experimental component but the theoretical implications of the discoveries Bomblies and her colleagues made have received much attention.

Bomblies was assistant professor and then Thomas D. Cabot Associate Professor of Organismic and Evolutionary Biology at Harvard University from 2009 until 2015. She briefly moved her lab to the John Innes Centre in Norwich, UK (2015-2019) before moving to the ETH in Zürich Switzerland to take up a full professorship in Plant Evolutionary Genetics and Molecular Biology in early 2019. Her research involves the evolution of meiosis, particularly recombination and chromosome segregation.

In her spare time she does illustrations, etchings and other art. She loves hiking, rock climbing, and other sports.

== Honors ==
- 2008 awarded a MacArthur Fellowship.
- 2022 received the "Golden Owl", an award which is voted on by the students and given by the VSETH (the students association of ETH) to lecturers for "exceptional teaching".
- 2026 was elected to the National Academy of Sciences.
