= Anne Edwards (botanist) =

British plant scientist

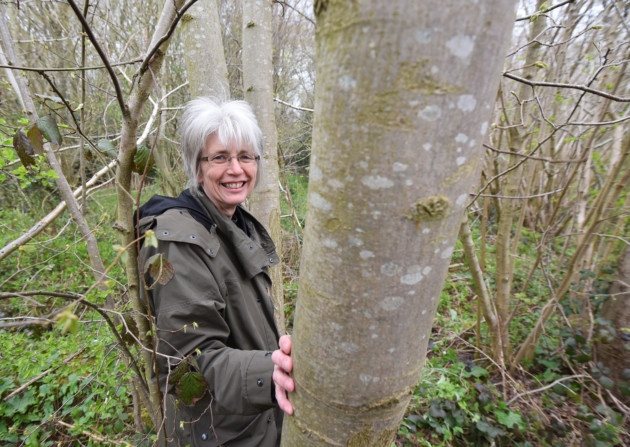
- Anne Edwards in Ashwellthorpe woods
- Known for: Ash dieback Grass pea
- Awards: British Empire Medal
- Scientific career
- Fields: Plant biology
- Institutions: John Innes Centre

Anne Edwards is a British plant scientist, based at the John Innes Centre. She was the first person in the UK to identify ash dieback disease in England.

== Research and career ==
=== Ash dieback ===
Edwards was the first person to identify ash dieback, caused by the fungus Hymenoscyphus fraxineus, discovering it in Ashwellthorpe Woods, Norfolk in 2012. Four years later she found a tree that was resistant to the disease and named it "Betty", which was used to help identify three genetic markers associated with resistance against the disease. Anne is heavily involved in the Nornex consortium, an open-access and crowdsourcing approach, which was established to respond to this outbreak. This involved creating a game, Fraxinus, where players analyse real data. She continues to play an active role in researching the disease, for example in estimating the mortality of trees it infects and tracing back how the fungus entered the country from just one or two fruiting bodies.

=== Grass pea ===
During her career Edwards has also worked on grass pea (Lathyrus sativus), one of the oldest known crops, native to southern and eastern Europe, Ethiopia, India, Bangladesh and Nepal. Grass pea is a key food source and is extremely drought and flood resistant. It has a very high protein content, and as a nodulating legume it requires no artificial fertiliser to grow, which enables it to improve soil conditions surrounding each plant. However, grass pea produces a toxin that can cause irreversible paralysis if it is consumed as the main food source over several months. As such, with Cathie Martin, Edwards is working to develop safe varieties that can be used by smallholder farmers.

=== Awards ===
In 2015 Edwards was awarded the British Empire Medal for services to the environment and the public understanding of science, for her discovery and work on the disease, plus her scientific communication outreach work. She was also given the Sydney Long Memorial Medal in 2024, for her contributions towards the promotion of conservation.
