= Raymond Dixon =

British microbiologist (born 1947)

Raymond Alan Dixon FRS (born 1 December 1947) is a British microbiologist at the John Innes Centre, Norwich, specialising on the molecular understanding of biological nitrogen fixation in bacteria. He was educated at the University of Reading (BSc, 1969) and the University of Sussex (DPhil, 1972).

In 1972, Dixon produced the first engineered nitrogen fixing organism by transferring nitrogen fixation genes from Klebsilla pneumoniae to Escherichia coli through conjugation. From 1975, Dixon continued his research at the Nitrogen Fixation Laboratory, which merged with the John Innes Institute and the Cambridge Laboratory to form the John Innes Centre in 1995.

Dixon was awarded the Fleming Award by the Society for General Microbiology in 1983 which recognises individuals who 'have made a distinct contribution to microbiology early in their career’. He was elected a Fellow of the Royal Society in 1999. In 2019, Dixon was a recipient of the Adam Kondorosi Academia Europea Award for Advanced Research in recognition of “revolutionary discoveries in symbiosis and related fields”.
