= Kenneth Manley Smith =

British entomologist (1892–1981)

Kenneth Manley Smith FRS CBE (13 November 1892, Helensburgh, Scotland – 11 June 1981) was a British entomologist and plant pathologist, known for his pioneering research on both insect viruses and plant viruses.

== Biography ==
Kenneth M. Smith, the son of a civil engineer, had three brothers and four sisters. He was his parents' fifth child and youngest son. His parents were English and his ancestors included many engineers, architects, parsons, and civil servants. At age two, he moved with his family to West Dulwich, South London, where he grew up. In boyhood, he was interested in natural history and enjoyed collecting butterflies and moths. He was a student at Dulwich College Preparatory School from 1902 to 1907 and at Dulwich College from 1907 to 1911. At the Royal College of Science (now part of Imperial College London), he matriculated in 1911 and graduated in 1914. Soon after graduation, he enlisted as a private in the 14th Battalion of the London Scottish Regiment. He served on the western front from September 1914 to January 1915, when he was invalided out and discharged. He returned to the Royal College of Science, where he did research with Herbert Greenway Newth on the development of collar cavities in lancelets (also known as amphioxi). At the Royal College of Science, Smith also did research on the antennal sense organs of Diptera and how feeding by capsid bugs damages plant tissues.

From 1920 to 1927, Smith did research at the University of Manchester, where he received his M.Sc. in 1922 and his D.Sc. in 1926. In 1920 the University of Manchester appointed him Senior Lecturer in Entomology. The Ministry of Agriculture appointed him Advisory Officer to the Counties of Lancashire and Cheshire. The University of Manchester assigned Kenneth M. Smith as entomologist and E. Smith-Holmes as mycologist to investigate potato leaf curl disease. In Manchester, Smith did research on Hemipteran feeding behaviour, especially regarding potato plants. Smith's duties in the advisory service acquainted him with practical horticultural problems. He studied onion root flies, cabbage root flies, and parasites associated with various vegetable root flies.

In 1927 Redcliffe Salaman, under the aegis of the Ministry of Agriculture, initiated the Potato Virus Research Station of the School of Agriculture of the University of Cambridge and made several appointments, including Kenneth M. Smith as entomologist. Smith's initial role at the research station was to investigate insect transmission of potato viruses. In 1927 Smith became a postgraduate member, under the supervision of J. Stanley Gardiner, of Downing College, Cambridge. There in 1929 Smith was awarded a Ph.D. In 1939 Salaman, the founding director, retired, and Smith became the director of the Potato Virus Research Station. He changed the name of the station to the "Plant Virus Research Station". In 1947 the Agricultural Research Council took control of the station and changed the name to the "Plant Virus Research Unit". As Smith became more interested in insect viruses, he changed the name of the unit to the "Virus Research Unit". During Smith's tenure as director, the laboratories were gradually modernized and new buildings were added. In 1959, at 67 he retired, under the Agricultural Research Council's age regulations, and Roy Markham became the director of the Virus Research Unit. From 1959 to 1962, Smith stayed on, working full time with his salary paid by a special funding arrangement.

Smith wrote a remarkable number of papers and books — both technical and popular. His collaborators include Roy Markham, Ralph Wyckoff, N. Xeros, Claude F. Rivers, and Robley C. Williams. Smith was the first to recognize the tomato bushy stunt virus, the turnip yellow mosaic virus, and the tobacco necrosis virus. In collaboration with Douglas E. Lea, he did pioneering research on the effects of ionizing radiation on viruses. Smith was primarily responsible for the discovery of the cytoplasmic polyhedrosis viruses.

In 1952 Kurt Jacoby of the Academic Press selected Kenneth M. Smith and Max A. Lauffer (1914–2012) as editors-in-chief of the book series "Advances in Virology". The first volume of the series was published in 1953. Smith also served on the editorial board of the journal Parasitology.

For two years from 1962 to 1964 Smith worked as a visiting professor in the University of Pittsburgh's biophysics department with Max A. Lauffer. For four and a half years from 1964 to 1969 Smith worked as a visiting professor at the Cell Research Institute at the University of Texas, Austin. There he worked with Howard Joseph Arnott. (1928–2022).

At age 77, Smith returned to Cambridge, where he completed the 3rd edition of A Textbook of Plant Virus Diseases (published in 1972) and two other books. He enjoyed gardening and was an avid cyclist.

In 1923 Smith married Germaine Maria Noël, a French citizen whose father was a lace manufacturer. Smith and his wife had one son, Marcel Travers Smith (b. 1929), who became a barrister.

== Awards and honours ==
Smith was elected in 1932 a Fellow of the Royal Society. He delivered in 1949 the Masters Memorial Lecture of the Royal Horticultural Society and in 1953 the Leeuwenhoek Lecture of the Royal Society. He was made CBE in 1956. For his work at the University of Texas, Austin, he was made an Honorary Citizen of Texas.

== Selected publications ==
=== Articles ===
- Smith, Kenneth M. (1920). "Investigation of the Nature and Cause of the Damage to Plant Tissue Resulting from the Feeding of Capsid Bugs". Annals of Applied Biology. 7: 40–65. doi:10.1111/j.1744-7348.1920.tb05105.x.
- Smith, Kenneth M. (1926). "A comparative study of the feeding methods of certain Hemiptera and of the resulting effects upon the plant tissue, with special reference to the potato plant". Annals of Applied Biology. 13: 109–139. doi:10.1111/j.1744-7348.1926.tb04254.x.
- Smith, Kenneth M. (1927). "An Unusual Form of Parasitism of an Anthomyid Fly". Parasitology. 19 (2): 260–262. doi:10.1017/S0031182000005655.
- Smith, Kenneth M. (1931). "Composite Nature of Certain Potato Viruses of the Mosaic Group". Nature. 127 (3210): 702. Bibcode:1931Natur.127..702S. doi:10.1038/127702a0.
- Smith, Kenneth M. (1931). "Thrips tabaci Lind. As a Vector of Plant Virus Disease". Nature. 127 (3214): 852–853. Bibcode:1931Natur.127..852S. doi:10.1038/127852a0.
- Smith, Kenneth M.; Bald, J. G. (1935). "A Description of a Necrotic Virus Disease affecting Tobacco and Other Plants". Parasitology. 27 (2): 231–245. doi:10.1017/S0031182000015109.
- Smith, Kenneth M. (1935). "A Virus Disease of Cultivated Crucifers". Annals of Applied Biology. 22 (2): 239–242. doi:10.1111/j.1744-7348.1935.tb07159.x.
- Smith, Kenneth M. (1935). "A New Virus Disease of the Tomato". Annals of Applied Biology. 22 (4): 731–741. doi:10.1111/j.1744-7348.1935.tb07180.x.
- Smith, Kenneth M. (1936). "Some aspects of the plant virus problem". Science Progress (1933-). 30 (119): 413–421. offprint. Washington, DC: Smithsonian Institution. January 1937. ASIN B004V3K2A0. LCCN 38000146.
- Smith, Kenneth M. (1937). "Further studies on a virus found in the roots of certain normal-looking plants". Parasitology. 29: 86–95. doi:10.1017/S0031182000026226.
- Smith, Kenneth M. (1941). "Insects and Plant Diseases". Nature. 148 (3742): 65–67. doi:10.1038/148065a0.
- Lea, Douglas; Smith, Kenneth M.; Holmes, Barbara; Markham, Roy (1944). "Direct and indirect actions of radiation on viruses and enzymes". Parasitology. 36 (1–2): 110–118. doi:10.1017/S003118200001204X.
- Smith, Kenneth M. (1946). "Tomato black-ring: A new virus disease". Parasitology. 37 (3–4): 126–130. doi:10.1017/S0031182000013263. PMID 20276049.
- Markham, Roy; Smith, Kenneth M. (1949). "Studies on the virus of turnip yellow mosaic". Parasitology. 39 (3–4): 330–342. doi:10.1017/S0031182000083918. PMID 18112015.
- Smith, Kenneth M.; Lauffer, Max A., eds. (January 1955). "Chapter. Morphology and Development of Insect Viruses by Kenneth M. Smith". Advances in Virus Research, volume 3. Academic Press. pp. 199–220. ISBN 978-0-08-058293-1.
- Williams, Robley C.; Smith, Kenneth M. (1958). "The polyhedral form of the tipula iridescent virus". Biochimica et Biophysica Acta. 28 (3): 464–469. doi:10.1016/0006-3002(58)90507-9. PMID 13560395.
- Smith, Kenneth M. (1959). "The Use of Viruses in the Biological Control of Insect Pests". Outlook on Agriculture. 2 (4): 178–184. Bibcode:1959OutAg...2..178S. doi:10.1177/003072705900200405.
- Smith, Kenneth M.; Hills, G.J.; Rivers, C.F. (1961). "Studies on the cross-inoculation of the Tipula iridescent virus". Virology. 13 (2): 233–241. doi:10.1016/0042-6822(61)90057-5.
- Smith, Kenneth M.; Lauffer, Max A., eds. (January 1965). "Chapter. Plant Virus-Vector Relationships by Kenneth M. Smith". Advances in Virus Research, volume 11. Academic Press. ISBN 978-0-08-058301-3.
- Arnott, Howard J.; Smith, Kenneth M. (1967). "Electron microscopy of virus-infected sunflower leaves". Journal of Ultrastructure Research. 19 (1–2): 173–195. doi:10.1016/S0022-5320(67)80067-4. PMID 6028174.
- Smith, Kenneth M. (1977). "Fungal and Algal Viruses". Plant Viruses. pp. 202–213. doi:10.1007/978-94-010-9653-9_15. ISBN 978-0-412-14740-1.

=== Books ===
- Smith, K. M. (6 December 2012). Plant Viruses (6th ed.). Springer. ISBN 978-94-010-9653-9. (pbk reprint of 1977 6th edition)
  - 1st edition. London: Methuen. 1935.
  - 2nd edition. 1948. LCCN 49003868.
  - 3rd edition, revised. 1960. LCCN 60052199.
  - 4th edition. London: Methuen. 1968. LCCN 68098851.
  - 5th edition. London: Chapman & Hall. 1974. LCCN 74165269.
- Smith, Kenneth M. (2 December 2012). A Textbook of Plant Virus Diseases. Elsevier. ISBN 978-0-323-16205-0.
  - 1937 edition. Philadelphia: P. Blakiston's Sons & Company. 1937. LCCN 38011483; 101 illustrations
  - 3rd edition. London: Longman. 1972. LCCN 73163410.
- Smith, Kenneth M. (1940). The virus; life's enemy. Cambridge University Press. LCCN 41001673.
  - 1948 edition. LCCN 49048451; added appendix to 1940 1st edition
- Beyond the microscope, by Kenneth M. Smith, F. R. S., being an account of a voyage of discovery in the borderland country between the "living" organism and the "non-living" chemical. Harmondsworth, Middlesex, England; New York: Penguin Books. 1943. ASIN B0006D8MII. LCCN 44001788.
- Smith, Kenneth Manley (1947). Virus Diseases of Farm & Garden Crops.
  - 1st edition. 1945. LCCN 46002733. OCLC 3181229.
- Smith, K. M. (1950). Introduction to the study of viruses. New York: Pitman Publishing Corp. LCCN 51002614; ix+106 pages
- Viruses. Cambridge University Press. 1953.
  - 1962 edition. LCCN 62004466.
- Smith, Kenneth M.; Markham, Roy (27 October 2011). Mumps, Measles and Mosaics. HarperCollins Publishers Limited. ISBN 978-0-00-744877-7.
  - 1954 1st edition. New York: Frederick A. Praeger; xii+160 pages ASIN B000J373PI
- Smith, Kenneth M. (1965). Biology of viruses. Oxford University Press. LCCN 65009538.
- Smith, Kenneth M. (2 December 2012). Insect Virology. Elsevier. ISBN 978-0-323-15859-6.
  - 1st edition. New York: Academic Press. 1967. LCCN 66029673.
- Smith, Kenneth Manley (1976). Virus-insect Relationships. Longman. ISBN 978-0-582-46612-8.
- Smith, K. M.; Ritchie, Donald Andrew (6 December 2012). Introduction to Virology. Springer. ISBN 978-94-009-5876-0.
  - 1st edition. London: Chapman and Hall. 1980. LCCN 79041116; chapters 1 through 8 & chapters 11 through 14 by K.M. Smith; chapter 9, The replication of viruses, and chapter 10, Virus genetics, contributed by Donald Andrew Ritchie
