= Roy Markham =

Roy Markham FRS
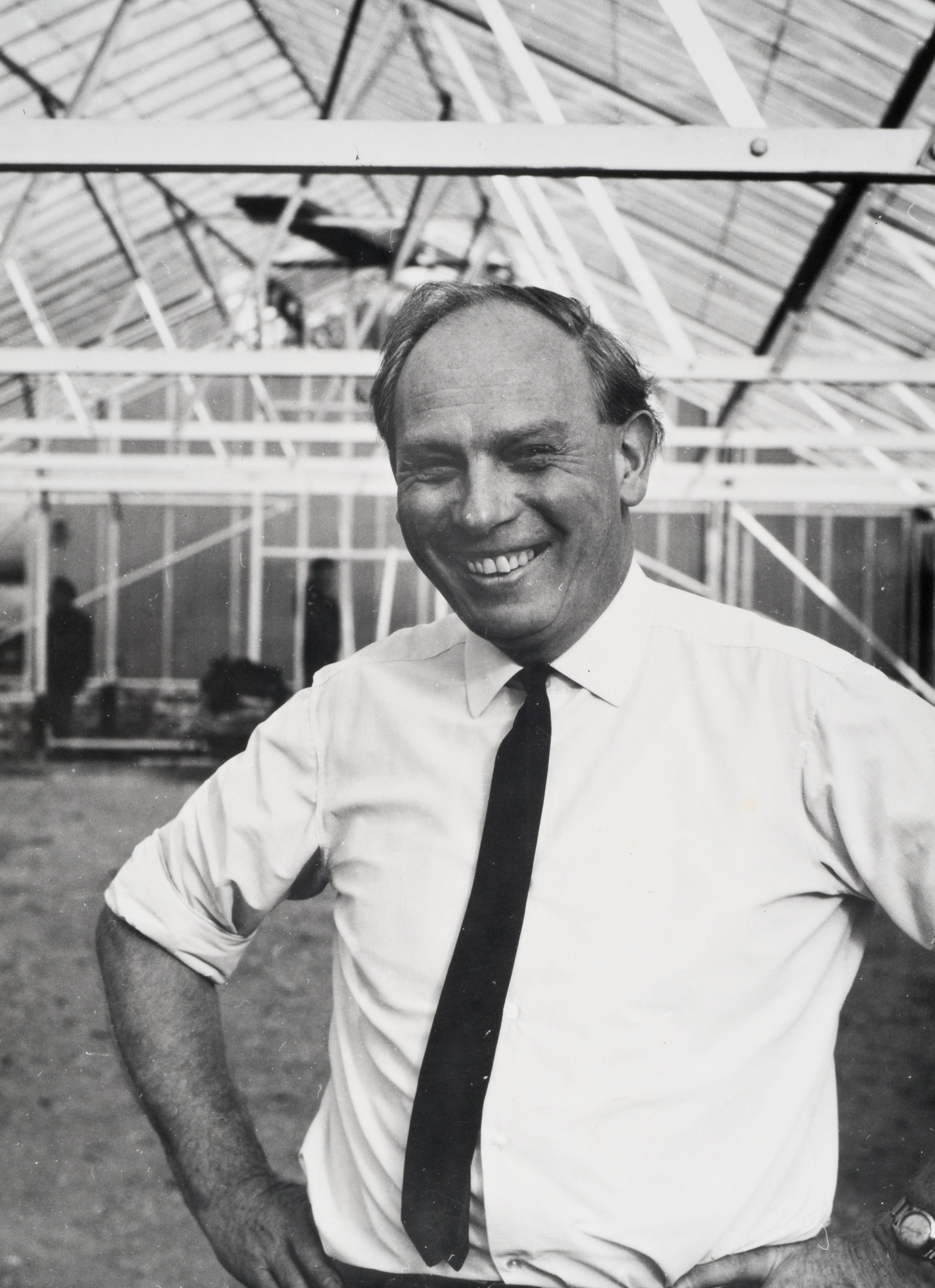
- Roy Markham at the glasshouses of the John Innes Institute in 1967.
- Born: 29 January 1916; London, United Kingdom
- Died: 16 November 1979 (aged 63)
- Office: Director of the John Innes Institute
- Term: 1967–1979
- Predecessor: Kenneth S Dodds
- Successor: Harold Woolhouse
- Spouse: Margaret Mullen
- Scientific career
- Education: University of Cambridge
- Fields: Botany; Virology
- Workplaces: University of Cambridge; John Innes Centre; University of East Anglia
- Doctoral advisor: Norman Pirie

Signature
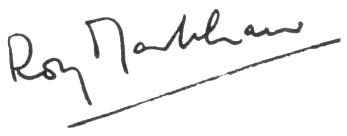

Roy Markham FRS (29 January 1916 – 16 November 1979) was a British plant virologist who served as the fifth director of the John Innes Centre from 1967 until his death in 1979.

== Early life ==
Markham was born in London in 1916. His family relocated to Bridge of Allan in Scotland while he was young and returned to London in 1925. He attended several schools in England and in Magdeburg, Germany, but he disliked all of these until he started at St Paul's School in London, aged 15. During his years at St Paul's, he enjoyed his annual summer holidays at his family's house in Ventnor on the Isle of Wight. It was there that he met Margaret Mullen, whom he later married.

== Research career ==
He joined Christ's College, Cambridge in 1935, specialising in biochemistry for the second part of his degree. He graduated in 1938 with an upper second class degree and became a PhD student in the laboratory of Norman Pirie, with whom he had worked as an undergraduate. For his thesis, which he completed in 1944, he worked on the isolation of plant viruses, including tomato bushy stunt virus and tobacco mosaic virus (TMV).

Markham continued working in Cambridge following his PhD, joining the Molteno Institute to work on the biochemistry of RNAs. One of his contemporaries at Cambridge was James Watson, who in his book, The Double Helix, recalls seeking TMV for an experiment:

I thus went to Roy Markham to see if any spare TMV was on hand. Markham then worked in the Molteno Institute, which unlike all other Cambridge labs, was well heated. This unusual state came from the asthma of David Keilin, then the Quick Professor and Director of the Molteno. I always welcomed an excuse to exist momentarily at 70 °F (21 °C) even though I was never sure when Markham would start the conversation by saying how bad I looked, implying that if I had been brought up on English beer I would not be in my sorry state. This time he was unexpectedly sympathetic and without hesitation volunteered some virus. The idea of Francis and me dirtying our hands with experiments brought unconcealed amusement.

— James Watson, The Double Helix

He returned to work on the structure of plant viruses at the end of the 1950s. He was particularly interested in using electron microscopy to look at virus architecture.

== Virus Research Unit ==
In 1960, Markham became director of the Agricultural Research Council (ARC) Virus Research Unit in Cambridge, succeeding Kenneth Smith. The research station was first opened in 1927 and became a research unit of the ARC in 1948.

== John Innes Institute ==
The John Innes Institute moved from Bayfordbury, Hertfordshire to Norwich, Norfolk in 1967, following its association with the newly-formed University of East Anglia (UEA). Before the institute's move was completed, its director, Kenneth S Doods, resigned to take up a position with the Food and Agriculture Organization in Turkey. Roy Markham was appointed as his successor, and he, along with the Virus Research Unit, moved to Norwich in October 1967.

Markham played an important role in establishing the institute at its new location. Its move from Bayfordbury had led the majority of the institute's staff to find employment elsewhere, and only 17 staff members moved to Norwich in 1967. However, under Markham's directorship, the institute grew and was reorganised into four new departments: Cell Biology, Genetics, Applied Genetics and Ultrastructural Studies. Markham also persuaded the trustees of the John Innes Foundation, which owned the land on which the institute was built, to provide a large lecture hall and recreational facilities, including a swimming pool, for the staff. He took great interest in developing much of the technology at the new institute and listed himself under the 'Electronics Section' in the institute's annual reports.

== Death ==
Roy Markham suffered a heart attack in 1978, from which he recovered. However, he later developed bowel cancer and died on 16 November 1979.
