= Andrew Balls =

British businessman

Andrew Thomas Balls
- Education: Keble College, Oxford (BA) Harvard University (MA)
- Parent(s): Michael Balls; Carolyn Riseborough

Andrew Thomas Balls is PIMCO's Chief Investment Officer for Global Fixed Income and a former Financial Times journalist. He is a brother of former UK Shadow Chancellor and former government minister Ed Balls; their father is zoologist Michael Balls.

== Education ==
Balls read philosophy, politics and economics at Keble College, Oxford graduating in 1995. He then went on to obtain a master's degree from Harvard Kennedy School.
