= Michael Balls =

English zoologist (born 1938)

Michael Balls CBE
- Born: 1938 (age 87–88)
- Education: University of Oxford
- Children: 3, including Ed and Andrew
- Scientific career
- Workplaces: University of Nottingham; University of East Anglia
- Doctoral students: Dennis Brown

Michael Balls CBE (born 1938) is a British zoologist and professor emeritus of medical cell biology at the University of Nottingham. He is best known for his work on laboratory animal welfare and alternatives to animal testing.

== Early life and education ==
Balls was born in 1938 in Norwich, Norfolk, the third son of Nellie Mary (née Dawson) and Charles Edward Dunbar Balls. He studied zoology at Keble College, Oxford, graduating with a second in 1960. He conducted research for a DPhil from Oxford at the University of Geneva Switzerland between 1961 and 1964, followed by post-doctoral research at the University of California, Berkeley, and at Reed College, Portland, Oregon, from 1964 to 1966.

== Career ==
Balls lectured in the School of Biological Sciences at the University of East Anglia, a job that he had got through his friend Ian Gibson. During that time he taught at Eton for a term. In 1975, he moved to the University of Nottingham Medical School as a senior lecturer in the Department of Human Morphology. Balls became Reader in Medical Cell Biology in 1985 and was promoted to Professor of Medical Cell Biology in 1990. Since 1995, he has been an emeritus professor at Nottingham.

Balls became a Trustee of Fund for the Replacement of Animals in Medical Experiments (FRAME) in 1979, and was Chairman of the Trustees from 1981 until his resignation in June 2013. He was Editor-in-Chief of Alternatives to Laboratory Animals (ATLA) from 1983 to 2018.

He acted as an adviser to the British government during the drafting and passage of the Animals (Scientific Procedures) Act 1986 and, from 1987 to 1995, was a founder member of the Animal Procedures Committee (which advises the Home Secretary on all matters related to animal experimentation). In 1993, Balls became the first Head of the European Centre for the Validation of Alternative Methods (ECVAM) which was established in 1991 within the European Commission's Joint Research Centre (JRC). He retired from this position in 2002.

In 2002, Balls was appointed a CBE.

== Awards ==
- Björn Ekwall Memorial Award (BEMA) (2015): "In recognition of his pioneering work in promoting animal welfare and alternatives to animal testing"
- Marchig Animal Welfare Award – World Society for the Protection of Animals
  1986 (first award)
- Russell & Burch Award – The Humane Society of the United States
  1994 Contributions to the advancement of alternative methods
- SmithKline Beecham Laboratory Animal Welfare Prize
  1997 Outstanding contributions to the welfare of laboratory animals
- Michael Kay Award – Royal Society for the Prevention of Cruelty to Animals
  1999 Recognition of services to European animal welfare
- Honorary member - European Society of Toxicology in Vitro - ESTIV

== Personal life ==
He is the father of politician Ed Balls and investment officer Andrew Balls.
