= Mervyn Bibb =

British microbiologist

Mervyn J. Bibb
- Born: 27 May 1952 (age 74); Cannock, Staffordshire, England
- Education: University of East Anglia (B.Sc., 1974; Ph.D., 1978)
- Known for: Genetic transformation of Streptomyces; Antibiotic biosynthesis and it's regulation Gene cloning in Streptomyces
- Awards: Fellow of the Royal Society (2013); Fellow, American Academy of Microbiology; Emeritus Fellow, Society for Industrial Microbiology and Biotechnology; Colworth Prize; Charles Thom Award; Norman Heatley Medal; David Gottlieb Medal; Lepetit Award; Docteur Honoris Causa, University of Lorraine (2015)
- Scientific career
- Fields: Molecular microbiology Genetics; Antibiotic biosynthesis
- Workplaces: John Innes Centre; Stanford University School of Medicine
- Thesis: (1978)
- Doctoral advisor: Sir David Hopwood
- Other academic advisors: Stanley N. Cohen (postdoctoral)
- Website: www.jic.ac.uk/people/mervyn-bibb/

Mervyn J. Bibb FRS is a British molecular microbiologist and Emeritus Fellow at the John Innes Centre in Norwich, England. He is known for his pioneering work on the genetics of antibiotic-producing bacteria, particularly Streptomyces species, and for developing genetic manipulation techniques that have enabled detailed understanding of antibiotic biosynthesis.

== Early life and education ==
Bibb was born in Cannock, Staffordshire, and grew up in the rural village of Wedges Mills. He attended Walhouse Junior School and Cannock Grammar School.

Bibb received his B.Sc. degree in Genetics and Developmental Biology with First Class Honours from the University of East Anglia (UEA) in 1974. He carried out his Ph.D. research on the genetics of Streptomyces coelicolor, a medically and agriculturally important model bacterium, in the Department of Genetics at the John Innes Institute in Norwich under the supervision of Professor Sir David Hopwood FRS, receiving his degree in 1978. His postdoctoral work in the same laboratory resulted in the first genetic transformation of Streptomyces species.

== Career ==
=== Postdoctoral research ===
From 1978 to 1982, Bibb pursued postdoctoral work at Stanford University School of Medicine in Palo Alto, California, under the guidance of Professor Stanley N. Cohen, where he carried out the first gene cloning experiments in Streptomyces species. This work, published in Nature in 1980, established a DNA cloning system for interspecies gene transfer in antibiotic-producing Streptomyces.

=== John Innes Centre ===
In 1982, Bibb returned to the John Innes Institute (now John Innes Centre, JIC) as a Group Leader. He later served as Head of the Department of Molecular Microbiology in 2000 and again between 2004 and 2009.

Between 2001 and 2003, he took a leave of absence from JIC to serve as Senior Research Director for Natural Product Discovery at Diversa Corporation (later Verenium, now part of BASF) in San Diego, California.

He is currently an Emeritus Fellow at JIC and holds honorary professorships at UEA, Imperial College London, the Institute of Microbiology at the Chinese Academy of Sciences in Beijing, and Wuhan University.

== Research ==
=== Antibiotic biosynthesis ===
Bibb's research has focused on understanding antibiotic production and its regulation in actinomycetes, the bacterial family that includes Streptomyces species and represents the major source of clinically useful antibiotics. Actinobacteria produce approximately two-thirds of all known antibiotics of microbial origin, many of which are used clinically.

His work has contributed to detailed understanding of how complex antibiotic molecules are synthesized and in particular how the biosynthetic pathways are regulated. This knowledge has enabled researchers to genetically engineer antibiotic-producing organisms to increase productivity and to create potentially improved derivative compounds.

=== Genome sequencing ===
Genome sequencing has revealed that actinomycetes possess the genetic capacity to produce many more natural products than previously recognized. Bibb's research also addressed the activation of these "silent" biosynthetic gene clusters to discover novel compounds with antibacterial activity. This work has identified gene clusters for several potentially useful molecules, including compounds that lacked biosynthetic precedents.

=== Biotechnology applications ===
Research from Bibb's group led to the formation of two John Innes Centre spin-out companies: Novacta Biosystems and Procarta Biosystems, both focused on developing new anti-infective treatments.

Novacta Biosystems developed a lantibiotic derivative that entered Phase II clinical trials for treatment of Clostridioides difficile infections.

== Teaching and mentoring ==
Since 2007, Bibb has taught on and later became the lead organiser of a biennial Summer School in Applied Molecular Microbiology held in Dubrovnik, Croatia. The programme provides training in the specialised metabolism of actinomycetes and related topics.

== Publications and impact ==
According to Google Scholar, Bibb has published over 190 research papers with an h-index of 89 as of March 2026. He has presented his work at over 70 international conferences.

== Honours and awards ==
- Fellow of the Royal Society (FRS), elected 2013
- Fellow, American Academy of Microbiology
- Emeritus Fellow, Society for Industrial Microbiology and Biotechnology
- Fellow, Royal Society of Chemistry
- Colworth Prize, Microbiology Society
- Charles Thom Award, Society for Industrial Microbiology and Biotechnology
- Norman Heatley Medal and Prize, Biochemical Society
- David Gottlieb Medal
- Lepetit Award
- Docteur Honoris Causa, University of Lorraine, Nancy, France (2015)

== Personal life ==
Bibb married Maureen (née Lynch) in 1978. They have two daughters, Eleana and Catherine and, courtesy of Eleana and Toby, they have three grandchildren: Sophia, Lillia, and Xavier.
