= John Beringer =

British microbiologist

Sir John Beringer
- Born: 14 February 1944 (age 82)
- Education: University of Edinburgh (BSc); University of East Anglia (PhD)
- Scientific career
- Workplaces: University of Bristol
- Thesis: Genetic studies with Rhizobium leguminosarum (1973)
- Doctoral advisor: David Hopwood

Sir John Evelyn Beringer CBE (born 14 February 1944) is a British microbiologist and emeritus Professor at the University of Bristol.

He was educated at the University of Edinburgh (BSc, 1970) and the University of East Anglia (PhD, 1973). He was Professor of Molecular Genetics at the University of Bristol from 1984 to 2005, and Pro-Vice-Chancellor from 2001 to 2005. He was made a Commander of the Order of the British Empire (CBE) in 1993 and was knighted in 2000.

He lives near Bristol with his wife Sheila and has three sons, David, Richard and Peter.
