= Anna Cheney Edwards =

American educator

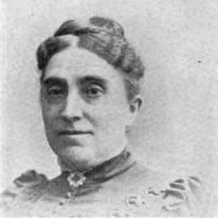
Anna Cheney Edwards

Anna Cheney Edwards (31 July 1835 - 1930) was a 19th-century American educator from the U.S. state of Massachusetts. She served as Associate Principal of Mount Holyoke Seminary, 1872–1888; and as Professor of Theism and Christian Evidences, 1888–1890.

== Early years and education ==
Anna Cheney Edwards was born in Northampton, Massachusetts, 31 July 1835. Her father, Charles, was sixth in descent from Alexander Edwards, one of the early settlers of the town. Her mother, Ruth White, of Spencer, Massachusetts, was also of Puritan ancestry. Granddaughter of Nathaniel Edwards and Rachel Clapp, his wife; great-granddaughter of Benjamin Clapp and Phebe Boynton, his wife; and great-great-granddaughter of Jonathan Clapp and Submit Strong, his wife. Edwards outlived all eight of her siblings.

There was an early fondness for books and a predilection for teaching. Edwards remembers making up her mind, on her first day of her attending school, at the age of four years, that she was to be a teacher. This was an inherited fondness, as her father and grandfather had successively taught the district school near the old Edwards homestead. Her great-grandfather, Nathaniel Edwards, was worthy of mention in the days of higher education for women, for his labors in the instruction of the girls of his neighborhood during vacation periods, because in his time, they were not allowed to attend school with the boys during the regular terms.

The teaching career began at the age of 16, after Edwards had passed through the public schools of Northampton, in an outer district of the town. After two years of experience, she entered Mount Holyoke Seminary (now Mount Holyoke College), South Hadley, Massachusetts, in September, 1853. At the end of one year, her studies were interrupted by three years more of teaching, after which she returned to the seminary and was graduated with a Bachelor of Arts degree in July, 1859.

In 1888, the degree of Master of Arts was conferred upon her by Burlington University (now University of Vermont.

== Career ==
Edwards was recalled as assistant teacher in the following year and was a member of the Holyoke faculty most of her career thereafter. She was absent at one period for about two years, her health being somewhat impaired, and from 1866 to 1868, she was principal of Lake Erie Seminary, Plainville, Ohio. She spent 18 months in travel in Europe, and in vacations, she took separate trips to New Orleans, California, Alaska and various parts of the United States and Canada. She was appointed second associate principal of Mount Holyoke Seminary in 1872, and first associate in 1883. A college charter having been obtained for that institution in 1888, she was made professor of theism and Christian evidences, and instructor of ancient literature. In scientific studies, she shared the enthusiasm and the wide reading of Lydia White Shattuck, the botanist, and became herself an earnest student and teacher of geology. She was identified with her alma mater in its religious character and work. For the use of her classes she printed in 1877 a volume of "Notes on Ancient Literature." She gave lectures to classes and to ladies' literary societies on a variety of topics.

Her more public activities were in the way of papers and addresses before the different associations of Holyoke alumnae and in connection with women's missionary meetings. From 1876, served as vice-president of the Hampshire County Branch of the Woman's Board of Missions. She died in 1930.
