= Dennis Brown (academic) =

British renal physiologist

- Education: University of East Anglia
- Scientific career
- Workplaces: Harvard Medical School
- Thesis: Control of Metabolic Processes in Amphibian Organ Culture (1975)
- Doctoral advisor: Michael Balls
- Website: https://csb.mgh.harvard.edu/brown

Dennis Brown is a renal physiologist. He is Professor of Medicine at Harvard Medical School, director of the Program in Membrane Biology at the Massachusetts General Hospital (MGH), and Associate Director of the MGH Center for Systems Biology. He is a member of the MGH Executive Committee on Research (ECOR), the central body for research governance at MGH.

== Early life and education ==
Brown was born in Grimsby, England and attended Wintringham Grammar School. He earned an undergraduate degree in biological sciences and PhD degree from the University of East Anglia. His dissertation supervisor was Michael Balls.

== Career ==
Brown was awarded the Carl W. Gottschalk Distinguished Lectureship in 1999, and the Hugh Davson award for Cell Biology in 2011, both from the American Physiological Society. In 2017-2018, Brown served as the 90th President, and is the current Chief Scientific Officer, of the American Physiological Society.

From 2002-2008, Brown served as editor-in-chief of the American Journal of Physiology. Cell Physiology. From 2009-2017, he served as editor-in-chief of Physiological Reviews. He was elected to the Academy of Europe in 2017.

Brown was awarded the A. Clifford Barger Excellence in Mentoring award from Harvard University in 2005 and the Harvard Medical School Dean’s Award for the Advancement of Women in Science in 2012.
