= John Kitching (physicist) =

British-born physicist and inventor

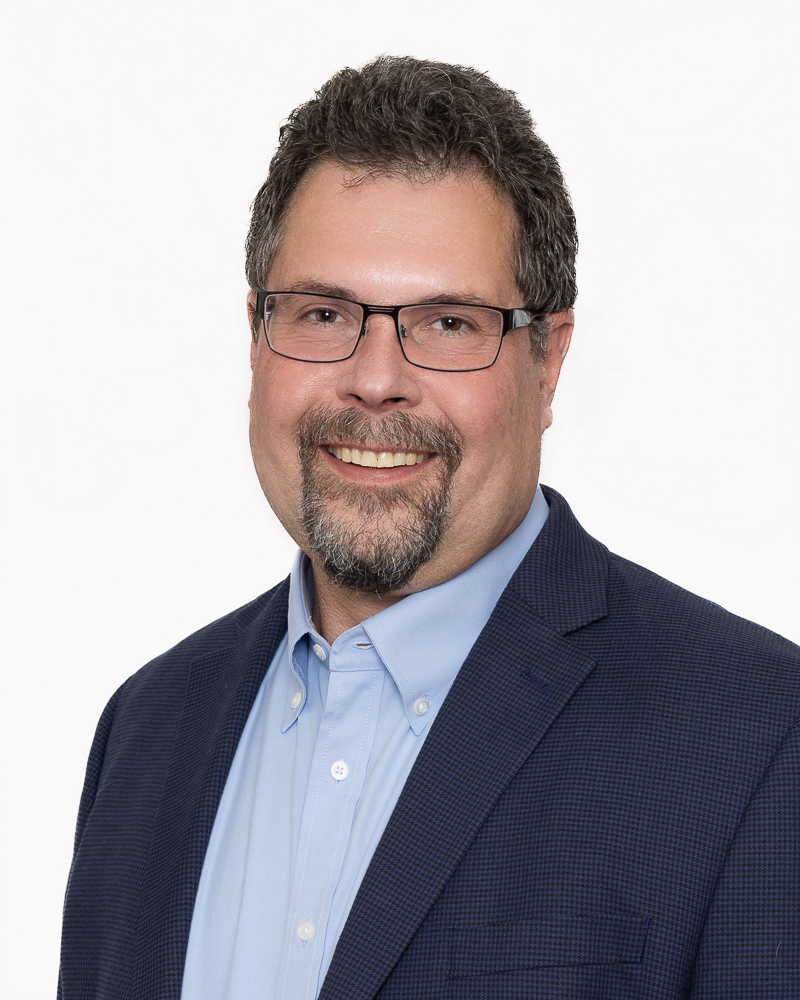
- Born: July 28, 1968; Chester, UK
- Occupation: Physicist
- Children: 1
- Parents: Peter Kitching; Josephine Kitching

John Edward Kitching (born July 28, 1968) is a British–Canadian–American physicist and inventor, and a Fellow and Group Leader at the National Institute of Standards and Technology. His research focuses on the development of compact "chip-scale" devices such as atomic clocks and magnetometers.

== Biography ==
=== Early life ===
Kitching was born in Chester, UK, to a physicist father and educator mother. His family emigrated to Canada when he was very young and he went to elementary and middle school in Edmonton, Alberta. He moved to Vancouver, BC, when he was 15 years old and attended Sir Winston Churchill Secondary School, winning the Governor General's Bronze Medal. He obtained his undergraduate degree in physics at McGill university in 1990, receiving the Governor General's Silver Medal for achieving the highest academic standing in the university's graduating class that year. He completed his PhD in Applied Physics at the California Institute of Technology in 1995 under the supervision of Prof. Amnon Yariv.

== Career and Research ==
Kitching's research focuses on the development of compact devices and instruments that combine elements of precision atomic spectroscopy, silicon micromachining and photonics. In the early 2000s, he and his group pioneered the development of chip-scale atomic clocks and magnetometers based on a patent filed with the USPTO in 2001. These instruments achieve an unprecedented combination of stability/sensitivity and small size, low power consumption, and manufacturability.

Kitching has also been heavily involved in the application of his compact instruments to problems in biomagnetism and nuclear magnetic resonance. He is currently leading in the development of compact, SI-traceable standards of length, time, voltage, current, and temperature under NIST's "NIST on a Chip" program.

Several of Kitching's patented inventions have been successfully commercialized. His original chip-scale atomic clock was on display for about a decade in the Smithsonian Air and Space Museum.

== Published works ==
- Svenja Knappe, Vishal Shah, Peter D. D. Schwindt, Leo Hollberg, John Kitching, Li-Anne Liew, John Moreland; A microfabricated atomic clock. Appl. Phys. Lett. 30 August 2004; 85 (9): 1460–1462. https://doi.org/10.1063/1.1787942
- Peter D. D. Schwindt, Svenja Knappe, Vishal Shah, Leo Hollberg, John Kitching, Li-Anne Liew, John Moreland; Chip-scale atomic magnetometer. Appl. Phys. Lett. 27 December 2004; 85 (26): 6409–6411. https://doi.org/10.1063/1.1839274
- Kitching, J., Donley, E., Knappe, S., Hummon, M., Dellis, A., Sherman, J., Srinivasan, K., Aksyuk, V., Li, Q., Westly, D., Roxworthy, B. and Lal, A. NIST on a Chip: Realizing SI units with microfabricated alkali vapour cells, Proceedings of the 8th international Conference on Frequency Standards and Metrology, Potsdam, -1, [online], https://tsapps.nist.gov/publication/get_pdf.cfm?pub_id=919803 (Accessed December 15, 2024)

== Recognition ==
- 2024: Distinguished Presidential Rank Award
- 2024: Outstanding Leadership Medal, NASA
- 2023: Fellow of the National Academy of Inventors
- 2021: Fellow of the IEEE
- 2021: Department of Commerce Gold Medal
- 2020: Paul F. Forman Team Engineering Excellence Award
- 2018: Fellow of the American Physical Society
- 2017: Federal Laboratories Consortium Award for Excellence in Technology Transfer
- 2016: IEEE I. I. Rabi Award[17]
- 2015: IEEE Sensors Council Technical Achievement Award
- 2014: Department of Commerce Gold Medal
- 2014: Rank Prize in Optoelectronics
- 2013: NIST Fellow
- 2008: Arthur S. Flemming Award
- 2007: Jacob Rabinow Applied Research Award, NIST
- 2005: Jack Raper Award for Outstanding Technology-Directions
- 2005: Department of Commerce Silver Medal
- 2005: European Young Scientist Award, presented by the European Frequency and Time Forum
- 1990: Governor General of Canada's Silver Medal
- 1986: Governor General of Canada's Bronze Medal
