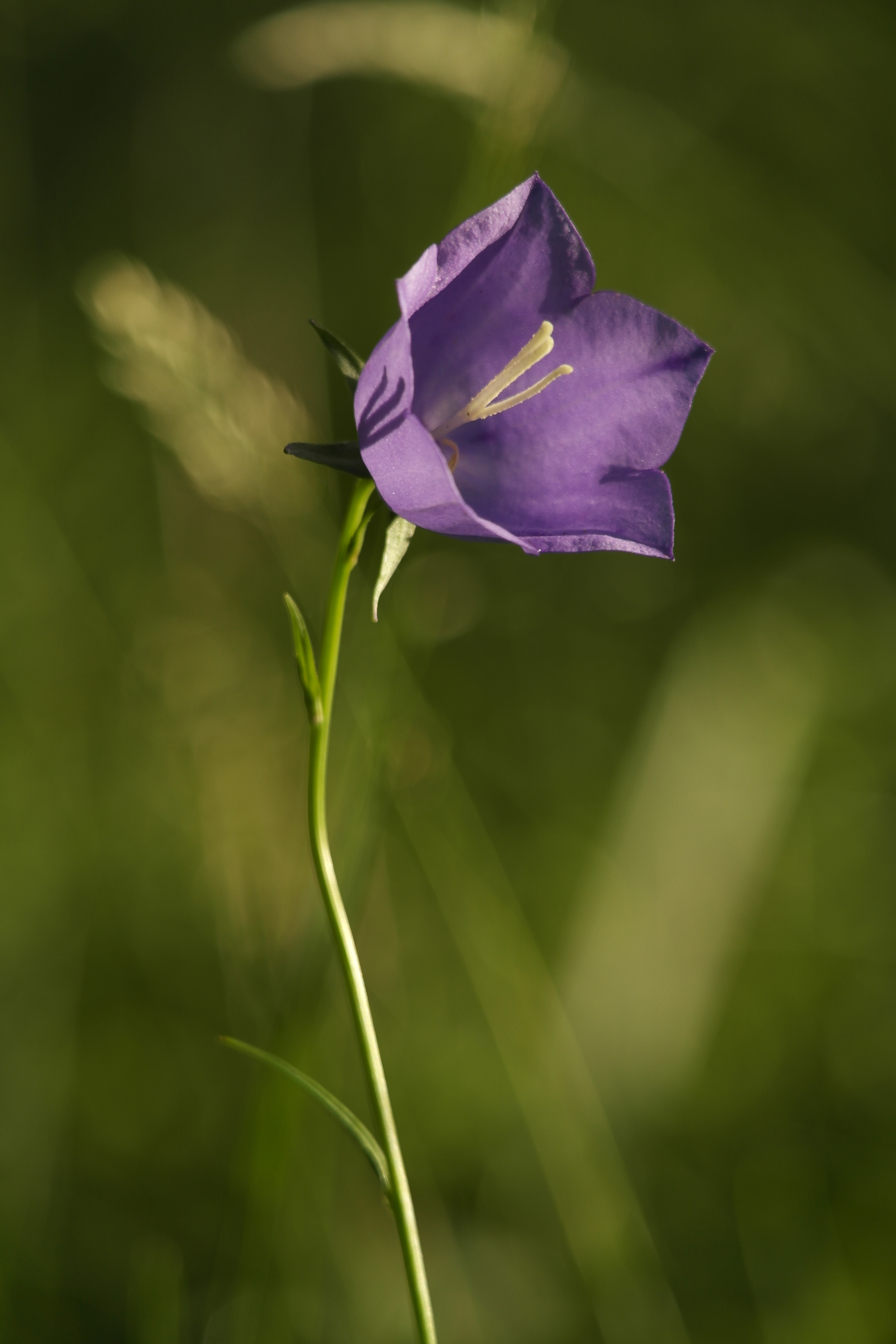

Scientific classification
- Kingdom: Plantae
- Clade: Tracheophytes
- Clade: Angiosperms
- Clade: Eudicots
- Clade: Asterids
- Order: Asterales
- Family: Campanulaceae
- Genus: Campanula
- Species: C. persicifolia

Binomial name
- Campanula persicifolia L.

= Campanula persicifolia =

Species of flowering plant

Campanula persicifolia, the peach-leaved bellflower, is a flowering plant species in the family Campanulaceae. It is an herbaceous perennial growing to 1 m (3 ft 3 in). Its flowers are cup-shaped and can be either lilac-blue or white. Its foliage is narrow and glossy with a bright green appearance.

It is widely considered an English cottage garden classic.

== Description ==
Campanula persicifolia is a clump-forming perennial herbaceous plant growing to a height of 30 to 100 centimetres (12 to 39 in). The stem is usually unbranched, erect and slightly angular. The basal leaves are short stalked and narrowly spatulate and usually wither before flowering time. The upper leaves are unstalked, lanceolate, almost linear with rounded teeth on the margins. The inflorescence is a few-flowered terminal raceme or there may be a single flower. The calyx is fused with five narrow lobes, eventually spreading. The corolla is five-lobed, 30 to 50 mm (1.2 to 2.0 in) long with five violet-blue (or occasionally white) fused petals. The corolla lobes are less long than they are wide. There are five stamens and a pistil formed from three fused carpels. The fruit is a strongly-veined conical capsule. The flowering period is from June to August.

== Distribution and habitat ==
Campanula persicifolia is common in the Alps and other mountain ranges in Europe. It grows at lower altitudes in the north, and higher up further south, passing 1,500 m (4,921 ft) in Provence. Normally it flowers in June; a dry summer may reduce or inhibit its flowering. Despite this it can flower as late as September in a cold year. The natural habitat of this plant is broad-leaved forests, woodland margins, rocky outcrops in broad-leaved woods, meadows and banks.

== Cultivation ==
In cultivation numerous varieties and cultivars have been developed in a range of colours including white, blue, pink and purple.
