= Michael Denis Gale =

British plant geneticist

Michael Denis Gale FRS (25 August 1943 - 18 July 2009) was a British plant geneticist.

He studied at West Buckland School, Birmingham University, and Aberystwyth University with Hubert Rees. He worked at the Plant Breeding Institute, Cambridge, and the John Innes Centre, Norwich Research Park. He was elected Fellow of the Royal Society in 1996.

== Awards and honours ==
- 1994 − gold medal from the Royal Horticultural Society
- 1998 − The Royal Society Darwin Medal, jointly with Professor Graham Moore

== Works ==
- Michael D. Gale and Katrien M. Devos, "Comparative genetics in the grasses", Proc Natl Acad Sci. 1998 March 3; 95(5): 1971–1974
