= Grass pea =

Grass pea is a common name for several plants, and may refer to:

- Lathyrus nissolia
- Lathyrus sativus
