= John Alwyne Kitching =

British biologist (1908–1996)

- Born: 24 October 1908; York
- Died: 1 April 1996 (aged 87)
- Education: Trinity College, Cambridge; University of London
- Spouse: Evelyn Mary Oliver
- Awards: FRS (1960)
- Scientific career
- Workplaces: Birkbeck, University of London; University of Edinburgh; University of Bristol; Princeton University; University of East Anglia

John Alwyne Kitching, known as Jack Kitching, (24 October 1908–1 April 1996) was a British biologist.

He was educated at Cheltenham College, Trinity College, Cambridge and the University of London. He was a Lecturer at Birkbeck, University of London, the University of Edinburgh, the University of Bristol and a Rockefeller Fellow at Princeton University. He was Professor of Biology at the University of East Anglia from 1963 to 1974 then Emeritus Professor, and also served as Dean of School of Biological Sciences from 1967 to 1970. He was made an OBE in 1947 and a Fellow of the Royal Society in 1960.
