= Harold Woolhouse =

British botanist

Harold William Woolhouse (12 July 1932 - 19 June 1996) was a British botanist.

Woolhouse was born in Sheffield in 1932. He was educated at the University of Reading where he gained a BSc in Horticultural Botany and at the University of Adelaide in Australia where he gained his PhD.

Woolhouse began his academic career in 1960 as a Junior Research Fellow at the University of Sheffield progressing to Senior Lecturer by 1969. He was then Professor of Botany at the University of Leeds (where he succeeded Professor Irene Manton, FRS) from 1969 to 1980 and thereafter director of the John Innes Centre from 1980 to 1989 and the Waite Agricultural Research Institute in Adelaide from 1990 until his death.
