= Irma Andersson-Kottö =

Swedish geneticist

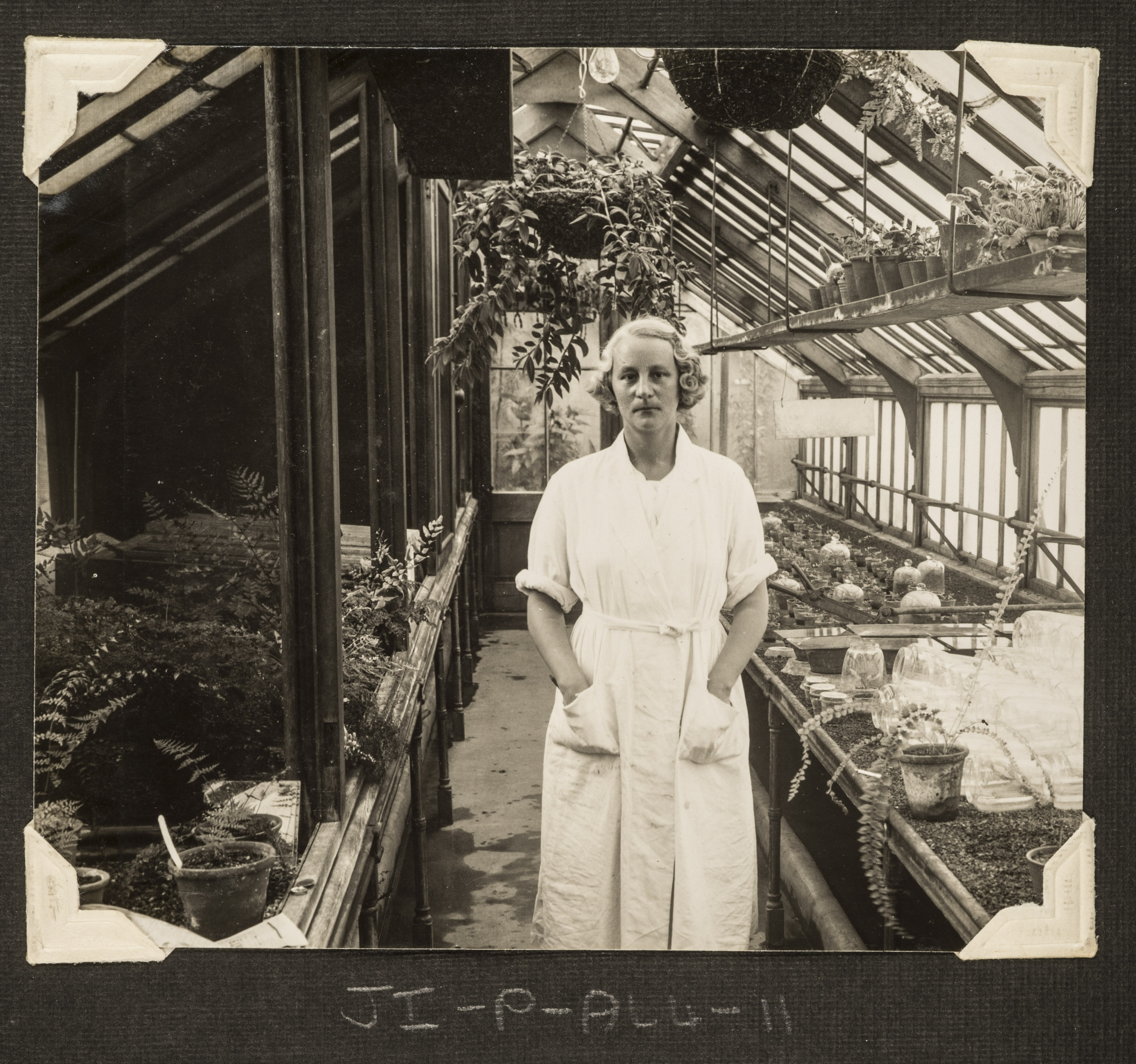
- Irma in her fern glasshouse at the John Innes Horticultural Institute
- Born: 1 January 1895
- Died: 7 July 1985 (aged 90)
- Education: University of Stockholm, University of London
- Known for: Pioneering work in fern genetics
- Scientific career
- Fields: Botany, Genetics
- Institutions: John Innes Horticultural Institution, Wenner-Gren Institute

Irma Andersson-Kottö (1 January 1895 – 7 July 1985) was a Swedish botanist and a pioneer in fern genetics.

== Education ==
Andersson graduated from the University of Stockholm. In 1919 she wrote to William Bateson and joined the then John Innes Horticultural Institution (now the John Innes Centre) as a volunteer worker, where later she was appointed as a student. From 1934–38 she undertook her PhD at the University of London.

== Research ==
Andersson studied inheritance in ferns and was the first to introduce the use of an agar-based growth medium for the experimental study of fern gametophytes. Her study of apospory and polyploid series in Asplenium scolopendrium was important in understanding the origin and development of the alternation of generations, a key concept in plant development. She was invited to join the British Pteridological Society as an honour member but elected to join as an honour subscribing member. After her time in the UK studying British ferns, she returned to Sweden to work at Wenner-Gren Institute, Stockholm. More recently some of her hypothesis on the dominance of certain alleles in ferns were confirmed experimentally.
