= Giles Oldroyd =

British biologist

Giles Oldroyd FRS
- Born: Giles Edward Dixon Oldroyd
- Education: University of East Anglia; University of California, Berkeley
- Awards: Royal Society Wolfson Research Merit Award
- Scientific career
- Fields: Plant symbioses
- Institutions: University of Cambridge; Stanford University; Donald Danforth Plant Science Center
- Thesis: Identification and characterization of Prf a resistance gene in tomato (1998)
- Notable students: Yiliang Ding
- Website: www.slcu.cam.ac.uk/people/giles-oldroyd

Giles Edward Dixon Oldroyd FRS is a British plant scientist and president of the Donald Danforth Plant Science Center. He previously served as a professor at the University of Cambridge, where he worked on legume symbioses in Medicago truncatula. He has been a Royal Society Wolfson Research Merit Award winner and the Society of Biology (SEB) President's Medal winner. According to Clarivate Analytics, Oldroyd was listed among the top 1% of highly cited researchers in plant sciences in multiple years beginning in 2014.

== Education ==
Oldroyd attended Huntington School, York before studying for a BA degree in plant biology at the University of East Anglia from 1990 to 1994. He completed his PhD in 1998 at the University of California, Berkeley, studying plant/pathogen interactions in tomatoes.

== Career and research ==
After his PhD, he moved to Stanford University to work as a postdoctoral scientist studying legume/rhizobial interactions in the laboratory of Sharon R. Long. In 2002, Oldroyd moved to the John Innes Centre to start his own research group and in 2017 he moved his research group to the Sainsbury Laboratory, University of Cambridge. In 2020, Oldroyd was appointed to the Russel R Geiger Professorship of Crop Science in the Department of Plant Sciences, University of Cambridge and Director of the new Crop Science Centre, a partnership between the University of Cambridge and the National Institute of Agricultural Botany.

Oldroyd's work focuses on understanding the signalling mechanisms that allow the associations with these beneficial micro-organisms and the use of this information to transfer the nitrogen-fixing capability from legumes to cereal crops.

In 2012, Oldroyd was part of a collaboration that received a US$10 million research grant from the Bill & Melinda Gates Foundation to study nitrogen-fixing symbioses in cereal crops, aiming to engineer cereal crops such as maize to undergo the beneficial root nodule symbiosis. The Enabling Nutrient Symbioses in Agriculture (ENSA) project received a further $35 million grant from Bill & Melinda Gates Agricultural Innovations in 2023.

As of January 2026, he has an h-index of 87, according to Google Scholar.

=== Awards and honours ===
- BBSRC David Phillips Fellow 2002-2007
- Royal Society Wolfson Research Merit Award 2002-2005
- European Molecular Biology Organization Young Investigator Award 2005-2008
- Presidents Medal, Society for Experimental Biology (SEB), 2006
- European Research Council young investigator 2009–Present
- Thomson Reuters Top 1% Highly cited researcher 2014
- Elected a Fellow of the Royal Society (FRS) 2020
