= David Hopwood =

British microbiologist and geneticist

- Born: 19 August 1933 (age 93)
- Education: St. John's College, Cambridge (BA); University of Glasgow (PhD)
- Awards: FRS (1979); Knight bachelor (1994); Gabor Medal (1995); Mendel Medal (1998)
- Scientific career
- Fields: Microbial genetics; Antibiotics; Genomics; Actinomycetota
- Workplaces: University of Glasgow; John Innes Centre; University of East Anglia
- Thesis: Genetical and Cytological Studies on Actinomycetes (1973)
- Doctoral students: John Beringer; Mervyn Bibb; Deng Zixin
- Website: www.jic.ac.uk/people/david-hopwood/; www.jic.ac.uk/STAFF/david-hopwood

Sir David Alan Hopwood FRS (born 19 August 1933) is a British microbiologist and geneticist.

== Education ==
Educated at Purbrook Park County High School and Lymm Grammar School, Hopwood gained his Bachelor of Arts degree from St John's College, Cambridge and his PhD from the University of Glasgow in 1973.

== Career ==
Hopwood served as an assistant lecturer in genetics at Cambridge until he became a Lecturer in Genetics at the University of Glasgow in 1961. He later became John Innes Professor of Genetics at the University of East Anglia. He is now an Emeritus Fellow in the Department of Molecular Microbiology at the John Innes Centre.

== Awards and honours ==
Hopwood was awarded the Gabor Medal in 1995 "in recognition of his pioneering and leading the growing field of the genetics of Streptomyces coelicolor A3(2), and for developing the programming of the pervasive process of polyketide synthesis". In 2002, he co-authored the sequencing of the S. coelicolor A3(2) genome. During more than forty years he has been studying the genetics and molecular biology of the model actinomycete S. coelicolor.

Hopwood was elected a Fellow of the Royal Society in 1979 and delivered their Leeuwenhoek Lecture in 1987. He is also the author of Streptomyces in Nature and Medicine: The Antibiotic Makers.

His nomination for the Royal Society reads:

Professor Hopwood has done outstanding work on the genetics of actinomycetes. He discovered genetic recombination of Streptomyces and developed original systems of genetic mapping which led him to the demonstration of a circular linkage group. This mapping work was important both in strengthening the generalization that the prokaryotes in general have circular chromosomes and in showing a tendency towards symmetry in the map suggestive of evolution by genome doubling. His electron microscope studies (with A. Glauert) showed beyond doubt the prokaryotic affinities of Streptomyces and demonstrated for the first time the existence of membranous "organelles" in continuity with plasma membrane. He has shown that the fertility system of Streptomyces coelicolor involves a sex factor associated with a plasmid. In the course of these studies he has discovered the first clear example of a plasmid-encoded antibiotics synthesis. Hopwood and his group have also extended the genetic analysis to other species of Streptomyces and Nocardia and demonstrated efficient DNA-mediated transformation to Thermoactinomyces. Current studies are directed towards the genetic analysis of development in S. coelicolor. While G. Semonti made some of the basic observations on recombination independently, Hopwood has been the prime mover in most of the advances. He now has an established international reputation as the leading pioneer and authority in what has become a very important aspect of microbial genetics.
