= Annie Edwards =

English novelist (c. 1830 – 1896)

- Born: c. 1830
- Died: 1896
- Occupation: novelist

Annie Edwards (c. 1830–1896), also known as Annie Edwardes, was a popular English novelist in the Victorian era. Three of her 21 books were adapted for the theatre. Perhaps her best-known work is her 1866 novel, Archie Lovell, which the playwright F. C. Burnand adapted in 1874.

== Life and career ==
Annie Cook was born in approximately 1830, was married to John Edwards and had one known child, a son, born in 1859. No one has yet discovered her exact birthplace or hometown, although the location of her novels suggest that she spent part of her life in the Channel Islands. When she became an established author, she began to use the surname "Edwardes", perhaps to differentiate her work from her female contemporaries, Amelia Edwards and Matilda Betham-Edwards.

Her literary career began in 1858 with the publication of her first novel, The Morals of May Fair. The Examiner called it "one of the cleverest novels of the day," and the Literary Gazette, though lamenting its overambitious plot, conceded that the story was "powerfully imagined". Her first major breakthrough occurred eight years and six novels later with the publication of Archie Lovell. The Saturday Review likened the appearance of this novel to the transformation of an ugly duckling into a swan, and the London Review stated that the public would take "deepened interest" in her career after reading such an enjoyable novel. It was also her first novel to be published in the United States.

As her career progressed, the heroines of her novels became less traditional and more Bohemian. Her novel Archie Lovell has been called "the apotheosis of Bohemianism." After its success in 1866, Edwards began to produce novels with more daring heroines, which due to their popularity, raised her average fee up to a respectable £500 per work and placed her among the notable novelists of her time.

In 1869, F. C. Burnand adapted her novel The Morals of May Fair into a play entitled The Turn of the Tide. Although it received poor reviews in the Athenaeum, the public seemed to enjoy the adaptation, and it showed "every sign of a success." Five years later, Burnand used her work again in the play Archie Lovell, which was also fairly popular. The third and final novel to be adapted as a play was Ought We to Visit Her? by W. S. Gilbert in 1874.

In 1896, Edwards died in the care of her son, who was then practising medicine. Her last novel, A Plaster Saint, was published posthumously and without final revisions.

== Popularity and criticism ==
Edwards' work was often advertised and serialized in widely read literary magazines, which indicates that she was a well-known and popular author. Ten of her novels were serialized in Temple Bar, then edited by George Bentley (1828–1895), and her books were frequently advertised in magazines such as the Athenaeum, Saturday Review, and Scots Observer. Since only popular authors were given spacious advertisements, Edwards was probably a famous author of the mid to late 19th century due to her continual presence in literary magazines.

According to the Saturday Review, her typical story was amusing, "a good shilling's worth of its kind," since she adeptly combined the styles of various well-known authors: "a fair dose of Ouida, a small allowance of M. Octave Feuillet, a situation from a once popular play, and a phrase or two from Henry James." Critics would often excuse perceived faults in her novels by recalling her overall charm, cleverness, and entertaining style of writing. The Academy called her "one of the cleverest of living lady novelists"; the Saturday Review congratulated her work for its "charming" beauty; and even the demanding Athenaeum reviewers, despite their criticism, still admitted that her stories were "clever" and "most amusing". She was also praised for her excellent descriptions. The Athenaeum noticed "her descriptive power" in the novel Jet, and the Saturday Review stated that A Ballroom Repentance, despite its vulgarity, showed that Edwards possessed "descriptive strength."

Although critics seem to have appreciated Edwards's descriptive skills in general, they disapproved of her detailed attention to sexual emotions, particularly regarding women. "It does not gratify us to read that a young lady 'heaves palpitating sighs,' or that 'her small white face is bathed in sweats,'" the Saturday Review wrote. Her work was sometimes viewed as needlessly vulgar – or, as George Saintsbury stated – it was "the reverse of subtle." In the case of her novel Leah, the Athenaeum noted that "the devious and dirty paths through which her characters are dragged, produce more effect upon the reader than the ultimate triumph of virtue succeeds in counteracting." However, readers and reviewers seemed to permit these lapses in tastefulness for the sake of entertainment, as Edwards remained popular. According to the Saturday Review, she was first and foremost an excellent storyteller, a skill which evidently excused her ethical shortcomings.

Critics also regularly pointed out technical faults in Edwards's writing, especially regarding grammar and spelling. While they remained respectful of her wit and storytelling skills, they were disappointed in her workmanship: "She has not made such good use of her materials as might have been expected," William Ernest Henley stated about her novel Jet. George Saintsbury blamed her mistakes on "that dreadful person the printer", but other magazines were more straightforward. The Athenaeum described her spelling as "antiquated" and remarked that her choice of "Miladi" (instead of "My Lady") was "perversely spelt."

Moreover, reviewers criticized her decision to write A Ballroom Repentance in the present tense. Saintsbury called it a "monstrosity" that she had "committed." He also questioned her factual accuracy, or at least the reliability of her sources. Saintsbury believed that rather than experiencing events first-hand or interviewing respectable individuals, her facts were based primarily on the comments of society journals, mixed with satirical remarks from high-brow magazines. He likened the literary combination to the controversial iguanodon of Professor Richard Owen, only "considerably less satisfactory."

Nevertheless, Edwards remained popular even after her death. Records from Mudie's Library show that at least one of her novels, Archie Lovell, was still requested and read by patrons in 1914, nearly 50 years after it was published. Her novel A Blue-Stocking is considered to be one of the first New Woman writings.

== Works ==
These are the first published UK editions of her novels as cataloged by the British Library.

- The Morals of May Fair (1858)
- Creeds (1859)
- The World's Verdict (1861)
- A Point of Honour (1863)
- The Ordeal for Wives (1864)
- Miss Forrester (1865)
- Archie Lovell (1866)
- Steven Lawrence, Yeoman (1868)
- Susan Fielding (1869)
- Ought we to Visit Her? (1871)
- A Vagabond Heroine (1873)
- Leah: a woman of Fashion (1875)
- A Blue-Stocking (1877)
- Jet: her face or her fortune? (1878)
- Vivian the Beauty (1879)
- A Ballroom Repentance (1882)
- A Girton Girl (1885)
- A Playwright's Daughter (1886)
- Pearl Powder (1890)
- The Adventuress (1894)
- A Plaster Saint (1899)

The Library of Congress catalogue shows that her novels were occasionally given different titles in America from the ones they bore in the United Kingdom, e. g. Philip Earnscliffe (The Morals of May Fair), Estelle (Creeds), Delicate Ground (The Ordeal for Wives), Rival Charms (A Blue-Stocking), and At the Eleventh Hour (A Ballroom Repentance). Her final three novels were never published in the United States, possibly due to copyright restrictions resulting from the International Copyright Act of 1891, which prevented publishers from pirating foreign work.
