= Huazhong Agricultural University =

Public university in Wuhan, Hubei, China

- 华中农业大学
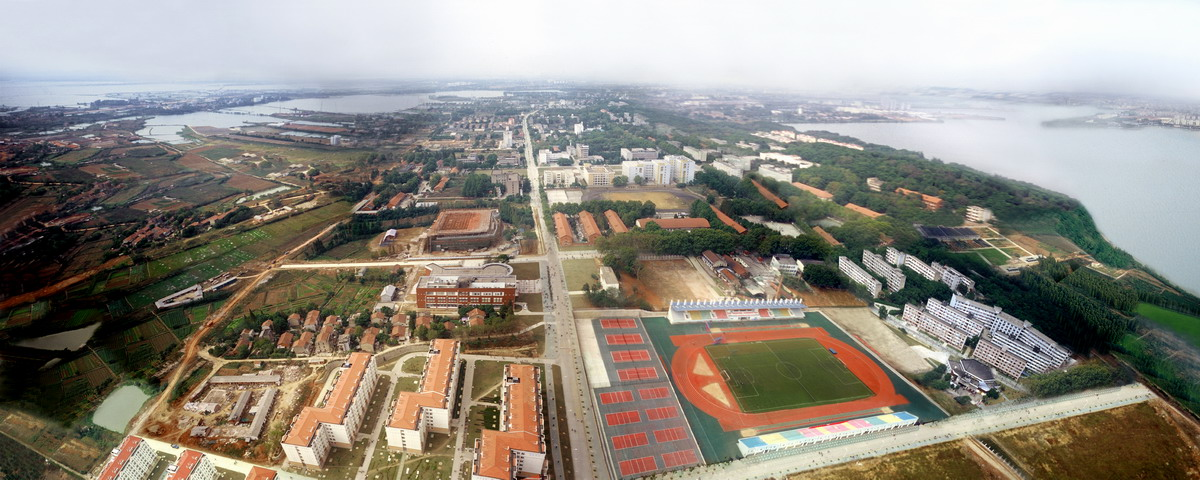
- Bird's eye view of the HZAU campus. Looking west, with Wuhan's South Lake being on the right
- Other name: Central China Agricultural University
- Established: 1952; 74 years ago
- Location: Wuhan, Hubei, China; 30°28′34″N 114°21′09″E
- Website: hzau.edu.cn

Huazhong Agricultural University (HZAU) is located in the main urban area of Wuhan, Hubei province in Central China. It was founded in 1898 during the reign of Emperor Guangxu (1871-1908) of the Qing Dynasty (1644-1911) by Zhang Zhidong, the then-governor of Hubei and Hunan provinces, as the Hubei Farming School in China.

In 1979, it was designated as a key national university directly under the Ministry of Agriculture and Rural Affairs by the State Council. In 1985, the university got its present name. It became a national Project 211 key university in 2005 and a national Double First-Class Construction university in 2017.

The school has, in the first round of "Double First-Class Construction" effectiveness evaluation, reached the first grade in seven out of nine evaluation indicators. Five disciplines -- namely biology, horticulture, animal husbandry, veterinary medicine and agricultural and forestry economic management -- were selected for the second round of construction disciplines under the national "Double First-Class Construction" initiative. Additionally, the school has been ranked among the world’s top 1% of ESI in agronomy, life sciences, science, engineering, medicine and social sciences.

With the vision of becoming a world-famous, research-intensive university with world-class dominant disciplines and distinctive characteristics, Huazhong Agricultural University has made significant efforts and achieved remarkable results, particularly in the fields of hybrid rapeseed, green rice, high-quality breeding pigs, animal vaccines, premium citrus, test-tube potatoes, cotton, corn, and freshwater fish, among other crop products.

The university trains a large number of innovative talents with global competence, and has made an impact on the world's scientific, technological and industrial development.

The education of international students can be traced back to 1960. In 2003, it became the first pilot unit of experts to develop highly-educated foreign students. HZAU offers advantageous and characteristic disciplines such as crop science, horticulture, animal husbandry, veterinary medicine, food science and engineering for international students. Currently, there are approximately 500 international students from 54 countries currently enrolled, with about 70 percent pursuing doctoral degrees and 30 percent pursuing master's degrees.

HZAU has won 30 national teaching achievement prizes, including one special prize, four first prizes and 25 second prizes. The university boasts three national key laboratories, three national engineering (technology) research centers, one national innovation platform for integration of production and education in biological breeding, one frontier science center of the Ministry of Education, four national experimental teaching demonstration centers, six agricultural science and education cooperation personnel training bases of the Ministry of Education and the Ministry of Agriculture and Rural Affairs, and 11 national off-campus practice bases for college students.

== Rankings ==
The QS World University Rankings ranked the university 298th in Asia in 2025 and 901-950 in World for 2026.

University rankings

Global – Overall
- QS World: 901-950 (2026)

Regional – Overall
- QS Asia: 298 (2025)
