= Dorothy Cayley =

British mycologist

Dorothy Mary Cayley
- Born: 1874; Sri Lanka
- Died: 1955 (aged 80–81)
- Occupation: Mycologist
- Employer: John Innes Horticultural Institution
- Known for: discovered Tulip breaking virus

Dorothy Mary Cayley (1874–1955) was a Sri Lankan mycologist who discovered in 1927 that "Tulip breaking" is due to a virus.

== Early life and education ==
Cayley was born in Sri Lanka in 1874, where her father, Sir Richard Cayley, was the 14th Chief Justice. Cayley came to England from Sri Lanka when she was seven and attended Stamford High School. She went to London University before studying horticulture at University College, Reading. Cayley was especially interested in plant disease and soils and entered the board of education's examination in horticulture which gained her first-class honours and a medal while in Reading. She also took a first class in the Royal Horticultural Society Examination and was appointed as the superintendent of the gardens that belonged to the Botanical Department at Reading.

In 1910 Cayley volunteered at the John Innes Horticultural Institute (now the John Innes Centre), then located at Merton, Wimbledon, where she worked in the attic of the Manor House before the laboratories were built. Bateson offered her a minor studentship in 1911.

Dorothy was also a talented artist. She drew the fungus she was examining and took her paint on holidays.

== World War 1 ==
Between 1914 and 1918 she contributed to the war effort by work such as cutting bracken in Savernake Forest for army horse bedding and tool setting for Vickers airplane factory. She resigned from her minor studentship in 1916 to commit to helping for the last 18 months of the war. Cayley assisted the Royal Army Medical investigations into tetanus at the Lister Institute of Preventive Medicine in London.

== Research ==
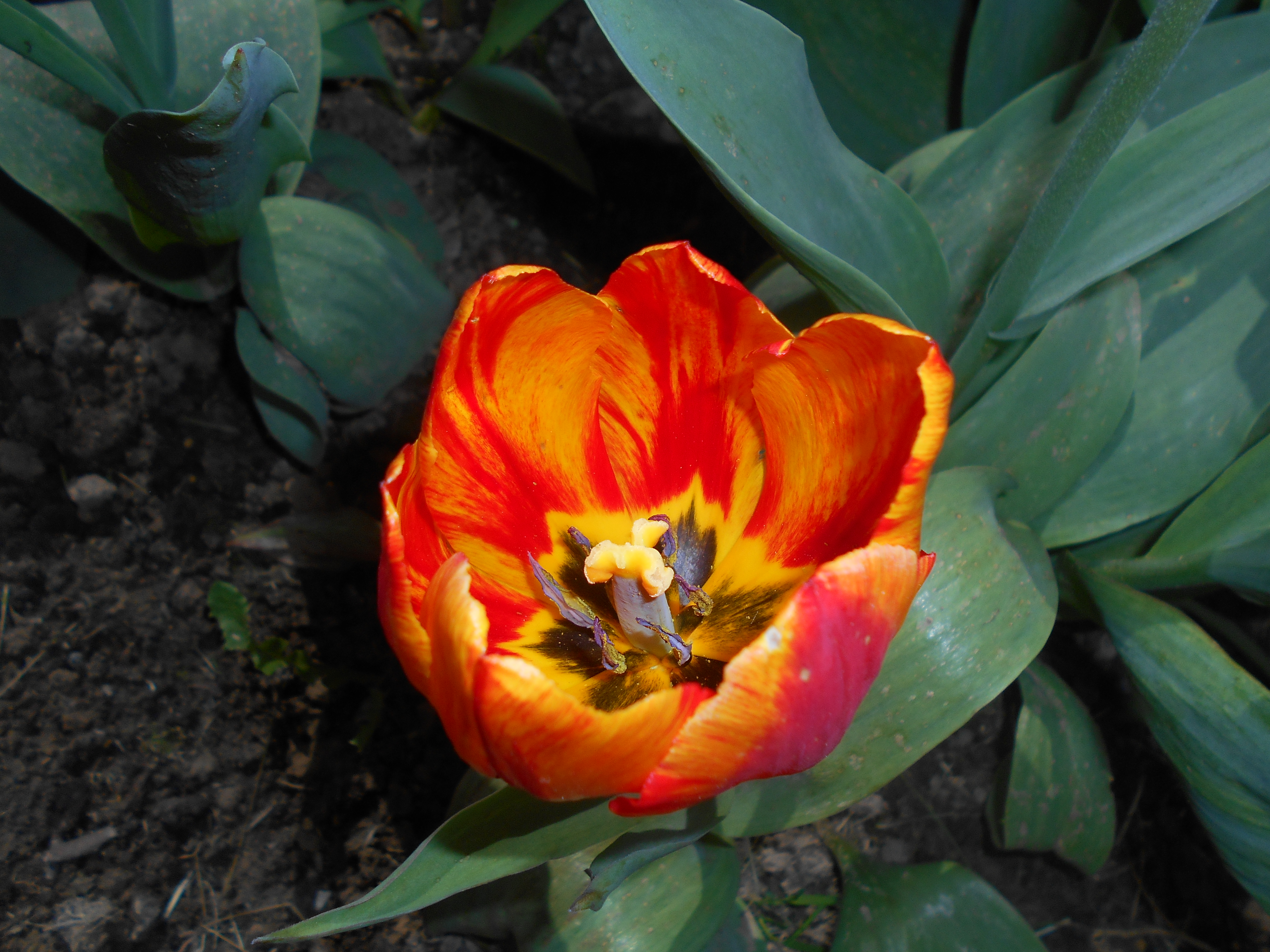
A tulip with the streaks caused by the virus

Building on the work of Sir Alfred Daniel Hall, Cayley started investigating the phenomenon of "Tulip Breaking" – the formation of feather-like patterns on tulip petals. Through bulb-grafting experiments, she found that "Tulip Breaking" could be transferred from one plant to another, rather than being genetic in nature. She concluded that the infectious agent was a virus as the filtrate of an infected bulb did not cause "breaking", and that the virus was probably spread by aphids. Tulip enthusiasts who wanted "true colours" were pleased as the research showed that "breaking" could be prevented by stopping infection of the bulbs (for example, by aphids). Cayley described her findings in two articles published in 1928 and 1932.

Cayley was also interested in other microbes. She worked on the diseases of peas and fruit, including the life history of the fungus that caused apple ‘die-back’. She studied the growth and development of slime moulds. She improved understanding of sexual reproduction in the fungi. She also investigated mushroom compost.

== Career roles and service ==
In 1919, Cayley returned to the John Innes Horticultural Institute, initially as a 'student' but was then given the title 'mycologist', and a salary that rose to £350. By 1928 Cayley had the role of deputy director. She retired from the John Innes Horticultural Institution in 1938.

She was a founding member of the Genetics Society in 1919. In 1939 she was the vice president of the British Mycological Society.

== Publications ==
Cayley's publications include:

- Dorothy M. Cayley (1923) Fungi associated with 'Die Back' in stone fruit trees. I. Annals of Applied Biology 10 (2) pp. 253–275.
- Dorothy M. Cayley (1923) The phenomenon of mutual aversion between mono-spore mycelia of the same fungus (Diaporthe perniciosa, Marchal). With a discussion of sex-heterothallism in fungi. Journal of Genetics 13 (3) pp. 353–370.
- Dorothy M. Cayley (1928) 'Breaking' in tulips. Annals of Applied Biology 15 pp. 529–539.
