= John Innes Centre =

Independent centre for research in plant and microbial science

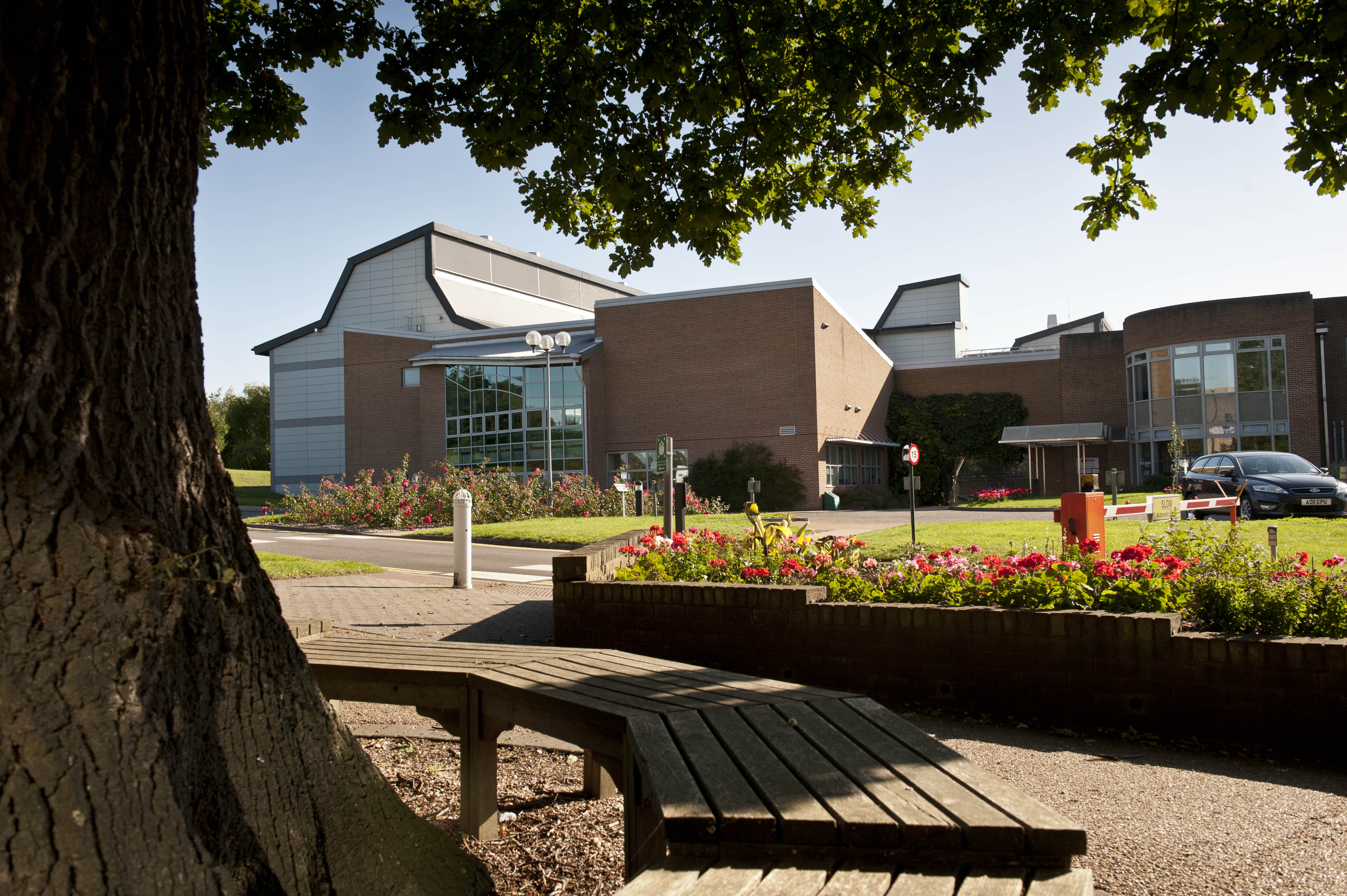
- The John Innes Centre (JIC)
- Former name: The John Innes Horticultural Institute (JIHI) (1910-1960); The John Innes Institute (JII) (1960-1994)
- Motto: Unlocking Nature's Diversity
- Established: 1909; 117 years ago
- Field of research: Plant science; Microbiology
- Director: Cristóbal Uauy
- Staff: 389
- Location: Norwich, Norfolk, United Kingdom; 52.62219189202393°N 1.22169524681226°E
- Affiliations: University of East Anglia; Norwich Research Park; BBSRC
- Website: jic.ac.uk

The John Innes Centre (JIC), located in Norwich, Norfolk, England, is an independent centre for research and training in plant and microbial science founded in 1910. It is a registered charity (No 223852) grant-aided by the Biotechnology and Biological Sciences Research Council (BBSRC), the European Research Council (ERC) and the Bill and Melinda Gates Foundation and is a member of the Norwich Research Park. In 2017, the John Innes Centre was awarded a gold Athena SWAN Charter award.

== History ==
The John Innes Horticultural Institution was founded in 1910 at Merton Park, Surrey (now London Borough of Merton), with funds bequeathed by John Innes, a merchant and philanthropist. The Institution occupied Innes's former estate at Merton Park, Surrey until 1945 when it moved to Bayfordbury, Hertfordshire. It moved to its present site in 1967.

In 1910, William Bateson became the first director of the John Innes Horticultural Institution and moved with his family to Merton Park. John Innes compost was developed by the institution in the 1930s, who donated the recipe to the "Dig for Victory" war effort. The John Innes Centre has never sold John Innes compost.

During the 1980s, the administration of the John Innes Institute was combined with that of the Plant Breeding Institute (formerly at Trumpington, Cambridgeshire) and the Nitrogen Fixation Laboratory. In 1994, following the relocation of the operations of other two organisations to the Norwich site, the three were merged as the John Innes Centre.

As of 2011 the institute was divided into six departments: Biological Chemistry, Cell & Developmental Biology, Computational & Systems Biology, Crop Genetics, Metabolic Biology and Molecular Microbiology.

The John Innes Centre has a tradition of training PhD students and post-docs. PhD degrees obtained via the John Innes Centre are awarded by the University of East Anglia. The John Innes Centre has a contingent of postdoctoral researchers, many of whom are recruited onto the institute's Post-doctoral Training Fellowship programme. The John Innes Centre also sponsors seminars and lectures, including the Bateson Lecture, Biffen Lecture, Chatt Lecture, Darlington Lecture and Haldane Lecture. In February 2025, the John Innes Centre announced the appointment of Professor Cristóbal Uauy who became director in September 2025.

== Research ==
The research at the John Innes Centre is divided into four Institute Strategic Programs (ISPs) funded by the Biotechnology and Biological Sciences Research Council (BBSRC). These ISPs, which combine the research of multiple groups to address a greater aim, were, from 2017 to 2023 as follows:

- Genes in the Environment - aims to develop a wider and deeper understanding of how the environment influences plant growth and development.
- Molecules from Nature - will investigate the vast diversity of chemicals produced by plants and microbes.
- Plant Health - aims to understand the molecular dialogue between plants and microbes, establishing how they communicate with each other and how they have evolved in relation to one another.
- Designing Future Wheat - a program with other BBSRC institutes Rothamsted Research and National Institute for Agricultural Botany (NIAB) and the University of Nottingham and the University of Bristol.

== Affiliations ==
The John Innes Centre co-located with The Sainsbury Laboratory (Norwich), an institute focused studying plant disease. The Sainsbury Laboratory is closely affiliated with the University of East Anglia. Along with the Institute of Food Research and University of East Anglia (UEA), JIC hosted the BA Festival of Science (now the British Science Festival) in September 2006. The John Innes Centre, University of East Anglia (UEA), The Sainsbury Laboratory, The Earlham Institute and Quadram Institute Bioscience have since 2016 run Women of the Future, an event aimed at promoting careers in science to young women.

== Directors ==
The John Innes Centre has been directed by:

- William Bateson (1910–1926)
- A. Daniel Hall (1926–1939)
- C. D. Darlington (1939–1953)
- Kenneth Dodds (1953–1967)
- Roy Markham (1967–1980)
- Harold Woolhouse (1980–1988)
- Richard B. Flavell (1988–1999)
- Chris Lamb (1999–2009)
- Dale Sanders (2009–2022)
- Graham Moore (2022–2025)
- Cristóbal Uauy (2025–present)

== Notable staff and alumni ==
Notable staff and alumni include:

- Janaki Ammal
- William Ormston Backhouse
- Nora Barlow
- Michael W. Bevan FRS
- Mervyn Bibb FRS
- Rowland Biffen
- David Baulcombe FRS
- Kirsten Bomblies
- H. G. Callan
- Rosemary Carpenter
- Myriam Charpentier
- Dorothy Cayley
- Keith Chater
- Enrico Coen FRS
- George Coupland FRS
- Caroline Dean FRS
- Yiliang Ding
- Raymond Dixon FRS
- Liam Dolan FRS
- Florence Margaret Durham
- Anne Edwards
- Xiaoqi Feng
- Michael Denis Gale
- Beverley Glover
- Robert M. Goodman
- J. B. S. Haldane FRS
- Harry Hall
- Jeffrey Harborne
- David Hopwood FRS
- Charles Leonard Huskins
- Nicholas Harberd FRS
- Richard Anthony Jefferson
- Georgii Karpechenko
- Leonard La Cour FRS
- Margaret Levyns
- Harlan Lewis
- Cathie Martin FRS
- Kenneth Mather
- Graham Moore (scientist)
- Sarah O'Connor
- Giles Oldroyd
- Anne Osbourn FRS
- Tracy Palmer FRS
- Clayton Oscar Person
- Dale Sanders FRS
- Diane Saunders
- Rose Scott-Moncrieff
- Alison Mary Smith FRS
- Steven M Smith
- C. B. Williams FRS

== John Innes Foundation ==
The John Innes Foundation (JIF) is an independent charitable foundation (registered Charity No. 1111527) and was formed in 1910 by John Innes. JIF set up the John Innes Horticultural Institution (JIHI) in London. Currently, the JIF owns the land and buildings at Newfound Farm in Bawburgh, Norfolk which are used by researchers from the John Innes Centre. The JIF trustees also play an active part in the management of John Innes Centre research and have the right to appoint three members of the Governing Council. The foundation sponsors several graduate studentships each year, support for educational programmes and the infrastructure of the site. They also fund student awards for scientific excellence and science communication. It also owns a very significant collection of archive material held in the Historical Collections library at the John Innes Centre.

== The Special Collection and the History of Genetics Library ==
The John Innes Centre is home to a collection of rare botanical books, lab books, manuscripts and letters documenting the history of genetics and research carried out by its scientists. This includes a letter from William Bateson documenting the first use of the word "genetics". The History of Genetics library also contains the archives of the Genetical Society.

== Germplasm Resources Unit ==
An important part of the John Innes Centre is the Germplasm Resources Unit (GRU). This seedbank houses a number of germplasm collections, including the Watkins Landrace Wheat Collection, the John Innes Centre Pisum Collection, BBSRC Small Grain Cereal Collection, Crop wild relative collection and several specialist genetic stocks collections. This material is extensively used by UK and non-UK researchers and breeders, and is an available upon request to research, academic and commercial efforts, subject to availability. The complete list of the material can be found in the GRU database.
