= Korean Science Olympiad =

Korean Science Olympiad is a contest to choose representatives of South Korea for the International Science Olympiad. There are:

- Korean Mathematical Olympiad
- Korean Physics Olympiad
- Korean Chemistry Olympiad
- Korean Biology Olympiad
- Korea Olympiad in Informatics
- Korean Astronomy Olympiad
- Korea Geography Olympiad
- Korean Earth Science Olympiad
- Korean Junior Science Olympiad
- Korean Youth Physics Tournament
- Korean Brain Bee
- Korean Linguistics Olympiad
