= Iranian Biology Olympiad =

Annual biology competition in Iran

Iranian Biology Olympiad (IrBO) is an annual multistage competition for Iranian high school students of the age of 17-18 in the field of biology. The first Iranian Biology Olympiad was launched under the auspices of the Ministry of Education, Iran in 1999. Since then, the four winners of the national competitions participate regularly in the International Biology Olympiad (IBO), in which IrBO is a regular member and participant. In Iranian Biology Olympiad individuals compete for their achievements in both theory and practice.

== Aims ==
IrBO tried to challenge and stimulate gifted students to expand their talents and to promote their career as biologists.

== History ==
IrBO was found in 1998, when Mohammad Karamudini, a biology educationist participated in the 9th IBO held in Kiel, Germany, as an observer from Iran. Here are the results for Iranian team in IBO competitions:

No	IBO	Host	Result
1	10th IBO (1999)	Sweden	2 silver and 1 bronze medals
2	11th IBO (2000)	Turkey	2 silver and 1 bronze medals
3	12th IBO (2001)	Belgium	One gold, 2 silver and 1 bronze medals
4	13th IBO (2002)	Latvia	2 silver and 2 bronze medals
5	14th IBO (2003)	Belarus	3 silver and 1 bronze medals
6	15th IBO (2004)	Australia	1 silver and 2 bronze medals
7	16th IBO (2005)	China	3 silver and 1 bronze medals
8	17th IBO (2006)	Argentina	3 silver and 1 bronze medals
9	18th IBO (2007)	Canada	4 silver medals
10	19th IBO (2008)	India	2 silver and 2 bronze medals
11	20th IBO (2009)	Japan	One Gold and 3 silver medals
12	21st IBO (2010)	S. Korea	3 silver and 1 bronze medals
13	22ed IBO (2011)	Chinese Taipei	2 silver and 2 bronze medals
14	23ed IBO (2012)	Singapore	3 silver and 1 bronze medals
15	24th IBO (2013)	Switzerland	2 gold and 2 silver medals
16	25th IBO (2014)	Indonesia	1 gold and 2 bronze medals
17	26th IBO (2015)	Denmark	1 gold, 2 silver and 1 bronze medals
18	27th IBO (2016)	Vietnam	1 silver and 3 bronze medals
19	28th IBO (2017)	United Kingdom	2 gold 1 silver and 1 bronze medals
20	29th IBO (2018)	Iran	2 gold 1 silver and 1 bronze medals
21	30th IBO (2019)	Hungary	3 silver and 1 bronze medals
22	31st IBO (2020)	Japan	3 silver and 1 bronze medals
23	32ed IBO (2021)	Portugal	1 gold, 1 silver and 2 bronze medals

== Organization ==
IrBO is supported by The Ministry of Education, Iran. IrBO National committee is responsible for all theoretical and practical exams and the results. Each student will pass 4 round of exams during the national competitions prior to become a team member.

== Relation to IBO ==
Dr. Mohammad Karamudini had been International Biology Olympiad coordinator for Iran since 1998. IrBO is running inside the rules and regulations of International Biology Olympiad, and is a regular participant and a member of it. Iran hosted the International Biology Olympiad in 2018.

== See also ==
- List of biology awards
