= Biffen Lecture =

The Biffen Lecture is a lectureship organised by the John Innes Centre, named after Rowland Biffen.

== Lecturers ==
Source: John Innes Centre

- 2001 John Doebley
- 2002 Francesco Salamini
- 2003 Steven D. Tanksley
- 2004 Michael Freeling
- 2006 Dick Flavell
- 2008 Rob Martienssen – 'Propagating silent heterochromatin with RNA interference in plants and fission yeast'
- 2009 Susan McCouch, Department of Plant Breeding & Genetics, Cornell University – 'Gene flow and genetic isolation during crop evolution'
- 2010 Peter Langridge, University of Adelaide, Australia – 'Miserable but worth the trouble: Genomics, wheat and difficult environments'
- 2012 Sarah Hake, Plant Gene Expression Center, USDA-ARS – 'Patterning the maize leaf'
- 2014 Professor Pamela Ronald, Department of Plant Pathology & The Genome Center, University of California, Davis – ‘Engineering crops for resistance to disease and tolerance of stress’
- 2015 Professor Lord May, Department of Zoology, University of Oxford – ‘Unanswered questions in ecology, and why they matter’
- 2016 Edward Buckler, US Department of Agriculture – ‘Breeding 4.0? Sorting through the adaptive and deleterious variants in maize and beyond’
- 2022 Professor Venkatesan Sundaresan, University of California, Davis – ‘Gametes to zygotes to self-cloning plants: The importance of being egg-centric’
- 2023 Professor Beat Keller, University of Zurich – ‘From the field, to the field: molecular characterization and breeding application of wheat resistance to fungal diseases’
- 2024 Professor Ken Giller, Wageningen University – ‘Land sparing and land sharing: regenerative agriculture, populism and the role of science’

== See also ==
- Bateson Lecture
- Chatt Lecture
- Darlington Lecture
- Haldane Lecture
- List of genetics awards
