= Bateson Lecture =

Annual genetics lecture in England

The Bateson Lecture is an annual genetics lecture held as a part of the John Innes Symposium since 1972, in honour of the first Director of the John Innes Centre, William Bateson.

== Past Lecturers ==
Source: John Innes Centre

- 1951 Sir Ronald Fisher - "Statistical methods in Genetics"
- 1953 Julian Huxley - "Polymorphic variation: a problem in genetical natural history"
- 1955 Sidney C. Harland - "Plant breeding: present position and future perspective"
- 1957 J.B.S. Haldane - "The theory of evolution before and after Bateson"
- 1959 Kenneth Mather - "Genetics Pure and Applied"
- 1972 William Hayes - "Molecular genetics in retrospect"
- 1974 Guido Pontecorvo - "Alternatives to sex: genetics by means of somatic cells"
- 1976 Max F. Perutz - "Mechanism of respiratory haemoglobin"
- 1979 J. Heslop-Harrison - "The forgotten generation: some thoughts on the genetics and physiology of Angiosperm Gametophytes "
- 1982 Sydney Brenner - "Molecular genetics in prospect"
- 1984 W.W. Franke - "The cytoskeleton - the insoluble architectural framework of the cell"
- 1986 Arthur Kornberg - "Enzyme systems initiating replication at the origin of the E. coli chromosome"
- 1988 Gottfried Schatz - "Interaction between mitochondria and the nucleus"
- 1990 Christiane Nusslein-Volhard - "Axis determination in the Drosophila embryo"
- 1992 Frank Stahl - "Genetic recombination: thinking about it in phage and fungi"
- 1994 Ira Herskowitz - "Violins and orchestras: what a unicellular organism can do"
- 1996 R.J.P. Williams - "An Introduction to Protein Machines"
- 1999 Eugene Nester - "DNA and Protein Transfer from Bacteria to Eukaryotes - the Agrobacterium story"
- 2001 David Botstein - "Extracting biological information from DNA Microarray Data"
- 2002 Elliot Meyerowitz
- 2003 Thomas Steitz - "The Macromolecular machines of gene expression"
- 2008 Sean Carroll - "Endless flies most beautiful: the role of cis-regulatory sequences in the evolution of animal form"
- 2009 Sir Paul Nurse - "Genetic transmission through the cell cycle"
- 2010 Professor Joan Steitz, Yale University - Viral noncoding RNAs: master regulators of RNA decay
- 2011 Professor Philip Benfey, Duke University - Development rooted in interwoven networks
- 2013 Professor Ottoline Leyser, University of Cambridge - 'Shoot branching plasticity, how and why'
- 2014 Professor Michael Eisen, University of California, Berkeley – ‘Embryonic adolescence: control of gene expression during early fly development’
- 2015 Professor George Church, Harvard Medical School – ‘Outer limits of genetic technologies’
- 2017 Professor Frederick M. Ausubel, Department of Molecular Biology, Massachusetts General Hospital – ‘Modelling Plant-Microbe Interactions’

== See also ==
- Biffen Lecture
- Chatt Lecture
- Darlington Lecture
- Haldane Lecture
- List of genetics awards
