= Daneshfar =

Daneshfar is a surname of Persian origin. Notable people with the name include:

- Ali Daneshfar, Iranian chemist
- Hossein Daneshfar, an editor of Roshd Biological Education
- Shafagh Daneshfar, a candidate in the 2016 Manitoba general election

== See also ==
- Daneshvar
