= Chatt Lecture =

Lectureship of the John Innes Centre

The Chatt Lecture, named after Joseph Chatt, is a lectureship of the John Innes Centre.

== Lecturers ==
- 2000 Robert Huber
- 2002 Tom Blundell
- 2003 Stephen J. Lippard
- 2004 Doug Rees
- 2005 George Whitesides
- 2006 Sir Jack Baldwin - "Studies on beta-lactam antibiotic biosynthesis"
- 2008 Timothy Richmond, ETH Zurich - "Chromatin structure and remodeling factor interaction"
- 2009 Fraser Stoddart, Northwestern University - 'Radically enhanced molecular recognition'

== See also ==
- Bateson Lecture
- Biffen Lecture
- Darlington Lecture
- Haldane Lecture
- List of biology awards
