= Daneshvar =

Daneshvar (Persian: دانشور) is an Iranian surname. Notable people with the surname include:

- Bardiya Daneshvar (born 2006), Iranian chess grandmaster
- Daniel Daneshvar (born 1983), American neuroscientist
- Fatemeh Daneshvar (born 1975), Iranian businesswoman and politician
- Masoud Daneshvar (born 1988), Iranian futsal player
- Mohammad Daneshvar (born 1993), Iranian cyclist
- Nazanin Daneshvar (born 1983), Iranian entrepreneur
- Simin Daneshvar (1921–2012), Iranian writer and translator

== See also ==
- Daneshfar
