= Sharon Robinson =

Sharon Robinson may refer to:

- Sharon Robinson (musician) (born 1958), American songwriter
- Sharon Robinson (cellist) (born 1949), American cellist
- Sharon Robinson (physiologist) (born 1961), British Antarctic researcher
- Sharon Robinson (born 1950), American educator and author; daughter of Jackie and Rachel Robinson
