= List of biology awards =

Awards for work in biological sciences

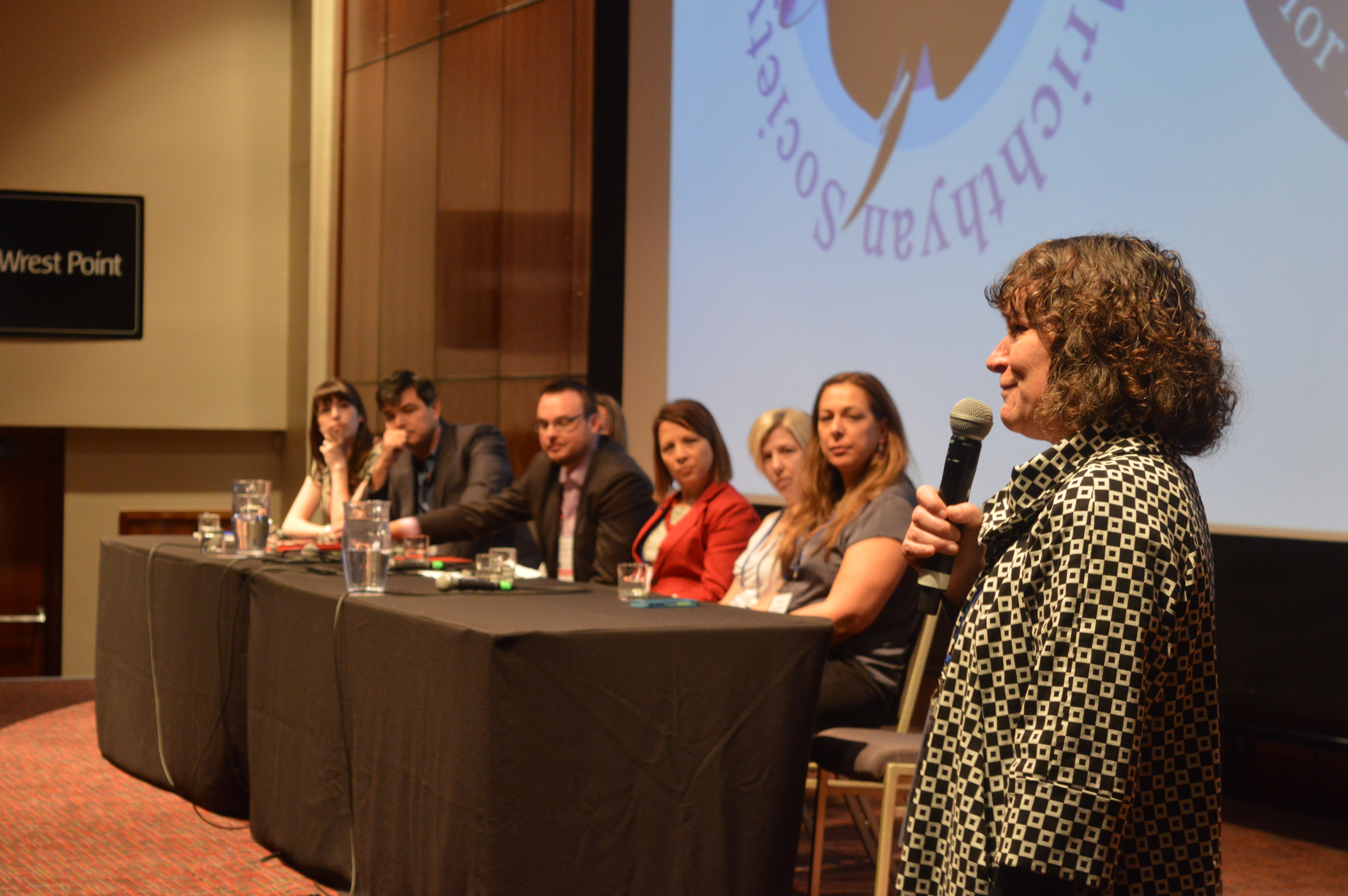
Bronwyn Gillanders (right), former Australian Society for Fish Biology President and 2016 K. Radway Allen Award winner

This list of biology awards is an index to articles about notable awards for biology. It includes a general list and lists of ecology, genetics and neuroscience awards. It excludes awards for biochemistry, biomedical science, medicine, ornithology and paleontology, which are covered by separate lists.

== General awards ==
=== International ===
| Country | Award | Sponsor | Notes |
|---|---|---|---|
| International | Alexander von Humboldt Medal (IAVS) | International Association for Vegetation Science | Vegetation scientist for an outstanding body of work |
| International | Carlos J. Finlay Prize for Microbiology | UNESCO | Outstanding contributions to microbiology (including immunology, molecular biology, genetics, etc.) and its applications |
| International | Edison Award | Edison Awards | Honoring excellence in innovation |
| International | Harrison Prize | International Society of Developmental Biologists | Developmental biology |
| International | Redi Award | International Society on Toxinology | Significant contributions in toxinology, the scientific study of venoms, poisons and toxins |
| International | UNESCO-Equatorial Guinea International Prize for Research in the Life Sciences | UNESCO | Scientific research in the life sciences leading to improving the quality of human life |

=== Americas ===
| Country | Award | Sponsor | Notes |
|---|---|---|---|
| Canada | Flavelle Medal | Royal Society of Canada | Outstanding contribution to biological science |
| Canada | Fry Medal | Canadian Society of Zoologists | Canadian zoologist who has made an outstanding contribution to knowledge and understanding of an area in zoology |
| Chile | National Prize for Natural Sciences | National Prize of Chile | Natural sciences |
| United States | Alexander Hollaender Award in Biophysics | National Academy of Sciences | Outstanding contributions in biophysics |
| United States | Asa Gray Award | American Society of Plant Taxonomists | Living botanist for career achievements |
| United States | Benjamin Franklin Award (Bioinformatics) | Bioinformatics Organization | Individual who has, in his or her practice, promoted free and open access to the materials and methods used in the life sciences |
| United States | Biotechnology Heritage Award | Biotechnology Innovation Organization and Science History Institute | Significant contributions to the development of biotechnology through discovery, innovation, and public understanding |
| United States | Breakthrough Prize in Life Sciences | Mark Zuckerberg, Priscilla Chan, Sergey Brin, Yuri Milner and Anne Wojcicki | Discoveries that extend human life |
| United States | C. Hart Merriam Award | American Society of Mammalogists | Outstanding research in mammalogy |
| United States | C. W. Woodworth Award | Entomological Society of America | Achievement in entomology in the Pacific region of the United States |
| United States | Daniel Giraud Elliot Medal | National Academy of Sciences | Meritorious work in zoology or paleontology study |
| United States | DeLano Award for Computational Biosciences | American Society for Biochemistry and Molecular Biology | Most accessible and innovative development or application of computer technology to enhance research in the life sciences at the molecular level |
| United States | E.B. Wilson Medal | American Society for Cell Biology | Significant and far-reaching contributions to cell biology over the course of a career |
| United States | Early Career Life Scientist Award | American Society for Cell Biology | Outstanding scientist early in their career |
| United States | Edwin Grant Conklin Medal | Society for Developmental Biology | Member of the society who has carried out distinguished and sustained research in developmental biology |
| United States | FASEB Excellence in Science Award | Federation of American Societies for Experimental Biology | Outstanding achievement by women in biological science |
| United States | Gilbert Morgan Smith Medal | National Academy of Sciences | Excellence in published research on marine or freshwater algae |
| United States | ISCB Innovator Award | International Society for Computational Biology | Leading scientists who are within two decades post-degree, who consistently make outstanding contributions to the field, and who continue to forge new directions |
| United States | José Cuatrecasas Medal for Excellence in Tropical Botany | Smithsonian National Museum of Natural History | Botanist and scholar worldwide of international stature who has contributed significantly to advancing the field of tropical botany |
| United States | Keith R. Porter Lecture | American Society for Cell Biology | Eminent cell biologist |
| United States | Larry Sandler Memorial Award | Drosophila Research Conference : Genetics Society of America | Best dissertation of the preceding year |
| United States | Leidy Award | Academy of Natural Sciences of Drexel University | Excellence in publications, explorations, discoveries or research in the natural sciences |
| United States | Louisa Gross Horwitz Prize | Columbia University | Outstanding contribution in basic research in the fields of biology or biochemistry |
| United States | MBC Paper of the Year | American Society for Cell Biology : Molecular Biology of the Cell | Paper judged to be the best of the year in the field of molecular biology |
| United States | March of Dimes Prize in Developmental Biology | March of Dimes | Investigator whose research brings us closer to the day when all babies will be born healthy |
| United States | Margaret Oakley Dayhoff Award | Biophysical Society | Woman who holds very high promise or has achieved prominence while developing the early stages of a career in biophysical research |
| United States | Mary Soper Pope Memorial Award | Cranbrook Institute of Science | Notable achievement in plant sciences |
| United States | Max Delbruck Prize | American Physical Society | Recognize and encourage outstanding achievement in biological physics research |
| United States | Merton Bernfield Memorial Award | American Society for Cell Biology | Outstanding graduate student or postdoctoral fellow who has excelled in research |
| United States | Methuselah Mouse Prize | Methuselah Foundation | World record for the oldest-ever mouse; Most successful late-onset rejuvenation strategy |
| United States | Michelson Prize and Grants in Reproductive Biology | Found Animals Foundation | Safe and effective, single-dose, nonsurgical sterilant for male and female cats and dogs |
| United States | NAS Award in Molecular Biology | National Academy of Sciences | Recent notable discovery in molecular biology by a young scientist who is a citizen of the United States |
| United States | Overton Prize | International Society for Computational Biology | Outstanding accomplishment by a scientist in the early to mid stage of his or her career |
| United States | Pearl Meister Greengard Prize | Rockefeller University | Women scientists in biology |
| United States | Romer-Simpson Medal | Society of Vertebrate Paleontology | Sustained and outstanding scholarly excellence and service to the discipline of vertebrate paleontology |
| United States | Selman A. Waksman Award in Microbiology | National Academy of Sciences | Excellence in the field of microbiology |
| United States | Sewall Wright Award | American Society of Naturalists | Fundamental contributions to the conceptual unification of the biological sciences |
| United States | W. Alden Spencer Award | College of Physicians and Surgeons, the Department of Neuroscience and The Kavli Institute for Brain Science at Columbia University | Outstanding research contributions |
| United States | WICB Junior and Senior Awards | American Society for Cell Biology, Women In Cell Biology Committee | Outstanding achievements by women in cell biology |
| United States | Wiley Prize | Wiley Foundation | Breakthrough research in pure or applied life science research that is distinguished by its excellence, originality and impact on our understanding of biological systems and processes |
| United States | William C. Rose Award | American Society for Biochemistry and Molecular Biology | Outstanding contributions to biochemical and molecular biological research and a demonstrated commitment to the training of younger scientists |

=== Asia ===
| Country | Award | Sponsor | Notes |
|---|---|---|---|
| India | National Bioscience Award for Career Development | Government of India | Recognizing excellence and promoting research in bio-sciences disciplines |
| India | Om Prakash Bhasin Award | Shri Om Prakash Bhasin Foundation | Research in science in India (biotechnology) |
| India | VASVIK Industrial Research Award | VASVIK | Excellence in industrial research in the areas of science and technology |
| India | Infosys Prize in Life Sciences | Infosys Science Foundation | Awards outstanding achievements of contemporary researchers and scientists across six categories, including Life Sciences |
| Iran | Iranian Biology Olympiad | International Biology Olympiad | Competition for Iranian high school students of the age of 17-18 in the field of biology |
| Israel | Sackler Prize | Tel Aviv University | Physical principles of biological systems |
| Japan | International Prize for Biology | Japan Society for the Promotion of Science | Outstanding contribution to the advancement of research in fundamental biology |
| Japan | Kihara Memorial Foundation Academic Award | Kihara Memorial Yokohama Foundation | Outstanding original research in life sciences |
| Japan | Kyoto Prize in Basic Sciences | Inamori Foundation | Global achievement in Basic Sciences |
| Pakistan | Abdus Salam Award | International Centre for Theoretical Physics, Pakistan chapter | Young Pakistani scientists for their research in chemistry, mathematics, physics or biology |
| South Korea | Donghun Award | Korean Society for Biochemistry and Molecular Biology | Members of who made creative research achievements in biochemistry and applied fields |
| South Korea | Korean Biology Olympiad | Korean Biology Educational Society | Finalists become eligible to join the International Biology Olympiad |

=== Europe ===
| Country | Award | Sponsor | Notes |
|---|---|---|---|
| Austria | International Birnstiel Award | Research Institute of Molecular Pathology | Doctoral Research in Molecular Life Sciences |
| Austria | Erzherzog Rainer-Medaille | Kaiserlich-königlichen zoologisch-botanischen Gesellschaft in Wien | Scientist in commemoration of Archduke Rainer of Austria |
| Austria | Lieben Prize | Austrian Academy of Sciences | Young scientists working in the fields of molecular biology, chemistry, or physics |
| Belgium | Golden Eurydice Award | International Forum for Biophilosophy | Outstanding contribution, or contributions over a period, in the field of biophilosophy |
| Europe | EMBO Gold Medal | European Molecular Biology Organization | Young scientists for outstanding contributions to the life sciences in Europe |
| Europe | EMBO Membership | European Molecular Biology Organization | Research excellence and the outstanding achievements made by a life scientist |
| Europe | John Maynard Smith Prize | European Society for Evolutionary Biology | Outstanding young researcher |
| France | Grand Prix Charles-Leopold Mayer | French Academy of Sciences | Outstanding work in the biological sciences; especially in the areas of cell or molecular biology |
| France | HFSP Nakasone Award | Human Frontier Science Program | Frontier-moving research, including technological breakthroughs, which has advanced biological research |
| France | Leconte Prize | French Academy of Sciences | Important discoveries in mathematics, physics, and biology |
| Germany | Ernst Schering Prize | Ernst Schering Foundation | Outstanding basic research in the fields of medicine, biology or chemistry |
| Germany | International Biology Olympiad | Leibniz Institute for Science and Mathematics Education | Science olympiad for high school students |
| Germany | Otto Warburg Medal | German Society for Biochemistry and Molecular Biology | Important work in the field of biological chemistry |
| Germany | Schleiden Medal | Academy of Sciences Leopoldina | Outstanding achievements in the field of cellular biology |
| Netherlands | Leeuwenhoek Medal | Royal Netherlands Academy of Arts and Sciences | Scientist judged to have made the most significant contribution to microbiology |
| Russia | A.O. Kovalevsky Medal | St. Petersburg Society of Naturalists | Contributions in the fields of evolutionary developmental biology and comparative zoology |
| Russia | Demidov Prize | Russian Academy of Sciences | Members of the Russian Academy of Sciences for outstanding achievements in natural sciences and humanities |
| Slovakia | Miroslav Zei Award | National Institute of Biology | Outstanding scientific achievements in biology |
| Sweden | Acharius Medal | International Association for Lichenology | Life work of distinguished lichenologists |
| United Kingdom | Beverton Medal | Fisheries Society of the British Isles | Lifelong contribution to all aspects of the study of fish biology and/or fisheries science, with a focus on ground-breaking research |
| United Kingdom | Bicentenary Medal of the Linnean Society | Linnean Society of London | Work done by a biologist under the age of 40 years |
| United Kingdom | Chatt Lecture | John Innes Centre | Plant science and microbiology |
| United Kingdom | Copley Medal | Royal Society | Outstanding achievements in research in any branch of science |
| United Kingdom | Darwin Medal | Royal Society | Work of acknowledged distinction in the broad area of biology in which Charles Darwin worked, notably in evolution, population biology, organismal biology and biological diversity |
| United Kingdom | Darwin–Wallace Medal | Linnean Society of London | Major advances in evolutionary biology |
| United Kingdom | FSBI Medal | Fisheries Society of the British Isles | Scientist in the earlier stages of his or her career for exceptional advances in fish biology and/or fisheries science |
| United Kingdom | Frink Medal | Zoological Society of London | Significant and original contributions by a professional zoologist to the development of zoology |
| United Kingdom | H. H. Bloomer Award | Linnean Society of London | Amateur naturalist who has made an important contribution to biological knowledge |
| United Kingdom | Irene Manton Prize | Linnean Society of London | Best thesis in botany examined for a doctorate of philosophy in the United Kingdom |
| United Kingdom | Linnean Medal | Linnean Society of London | Awarded annually to alternately a botanist or a zoologist |
| United Kingdom | Linnean Tercentenary Medal | Linnean Society of London | Outstanding contributions to natural history |
| United Kingdom | Marjory Stephenson Prize | Microbiology Society | Outstanding contribution of current importance in microbiology |
| United Kingdom | Royal Botanic Garden Edinburgh Medal | Royal Botanic Garden Edinburgh | Outstanding individual contribution in any field related to the work of the RBGE |
| United Kingdom | Royal Society Africa Prize | Royal Society | Researchers at the start of their career who are making innovative contributions to the biological sciences in Africa |
| United Kingdom | Stamford Raffles Award | Zoological Society of London | Distinguished contributions to zoology by amateur zoologists or professional zoologists in recognition of contributions which are outside the scope of their professional activities |
| United Kingdom | Trail-Crisp Award | Linnean Society of London | Outstanding contribution to biological microscopy that has been published in the UK |
| United Kingdom | Waddington Medal | British Society for Developmental Biology | Outstanding research performance as well as services to the developmental biology community |
| United Kingdom | William Bate Hardy Prize | Cambridge Philosophical Society | Original memoir, investigation or discovery by a member of the University of Cambridge in connection with Biological Science |

=== Oceania ===
| Country | Award | Sponsor | Notes |
|---|---|---|---|
| Australia | Clarke Medal | Royal Society of New South Wales | Distinguished work in the Natural Sciences (geology, botany and zoology) done in the Australian Commonwealth and its territories |
| Australia | K. Radway Allen Award | Australian Society for Fish Biology | Outstanding contribution in fish or fisheries science |
| Australia | Macfarlane Burnet Medal and Lecture | Australian Academy of Science | Outstanding scientific research in the biological sciences |
| Australia | Suzanne Cory Medal for Biomedical Sciences | Australian Academy of Science | Biomedical or biological research |
| Australia | Whitley Awards | Royal Zoological Society of New South Wales | Outstanding publications, either printed or electronic, that contain new information about the fauna of the Australasian region |

== Ecology ==
| Country | Award | Sponsor | Notes |
|---|---|---|---|
| Germany | ECI Prize | International Ecology Institute, Otto Kinne Foundation | Ecologist distinguished by outstanding and sustained scientific achievements |
| United States | Eminent Ecologist Award | Ecological Society of America | Outstanding contribution to the science of ecology |
| Sweden | Kempe Award for Distinguished Ecologists | Kempe Foundations, Umeå University and the Swedish University of Agricultural Sciences | Outstanding individuals within the science of ecology |
| United States | LExEN | National Science Foundation | Research into life-supporting environments in the polar regions |
| United Kingdom | Marsh Ecology Award | Marsh Christian Trust and British Ecological Society | Outstanding recent discovery or development which has had a significant impact on the development of the science of ecology or its application |
| Spain | Ramon Margalef Prize in Ecology | Generalitat de Catalunya | Exceptional scientific career or discovery in the field of ecology or other environmental science |
| United States | Robert H. MacArthur Award | Ecological Society of America | Established ecologist in mid-career for meritorious contributions to ecology |

== Genetics ==
Genetics is a branch of biology concerned with the study of genes, genetic variation, and heredity in organisms.

| Country | Award | Sponsor | Notes |
|---|---|---|---|
| United States | Archon X Prize | X Prize Foundation | First team to rapidly, accurately and economically sequence 100 whole human genomes to an unprecedented level of accuracy |
| United Kingdom | Bateson Lecture | John Innes Centre | Genetics lecture |
| United Kingdom | Biffen Lecture | John Innes Centre | Genetics lecture |
| United Kingdom | Crick Lecture | Royal Society | Biology, particularly the areas which Francis Crick worked (genetics, molecular biology and neurobiology) |
| United States | Curt Stern Award | American Society of Human Genetics | Outstanding scientific achievements in human genetics |
| United Kingdom | Darlington Lecture | John Innes Centre | Genetics lecture |
| United States | Edward Novitski Prize | Genetics Society of America | Extraordinary level of creativity and intellectual ingenuity in solving significant problems in genetics research |
| United States | Elizabeth W. Jones Award for Excellence in Education | Genetics Society of America | Noteworthy contributions to genetics education |
| United Kingdom | Genetics Society Medal | The Genetics Society | Outstanding research contributions to genetics |
| United States | Genetics Society of America Medal | Genetics Society of America | Outstanding contributions to the field of genetics |
| United States | George W. Beadle Award | Genetics Society of America | Outstanding contributions to genetics |
| United States | Gruber Prize in Genetics | Gruber Foundation | Distinguished contributions in any realm of genetics research |
| United Kingdom | Haldane Lecture | John Innes Centre | Genetics lecture |
| United Kingdom | JBS Haldane Lecture | The Genetics Society | Outstanding ability to communicate topical subjects in genetics research, widely interpreted, to an interested lay audience |
| United States | McClintock Prize | Maize Genetics Executive Committee | Plant genetics and genomics |
| United Kingdom | Mendel Medal | The Genetics Society | Outstanding contributions to research in any field of genetics |
| Australia | Ruth Stephens Gani Medal | Australian Academy of Science | Research in human genetics |
| United States | Thomas Hunt Morgan Medal | Genetics Society of America | Lifetime contributions to the field of genetics |
| United States | William Allan Award | American Society of Human Genetics | Substantial and far-reaching scientific contributions to human genetics carried out over a sustained period of scientific inquiry and productivity |

== Neuroscience ==
| Country | Award | Sponsor | Notes |
|---|---|---|---|
| United States | Eppendorf & Science Prize for Neurobiology | American Association for the Advancement of Science | Promising new neurobiologists |
| United States | Golden Brain Award | Minerva Foundation | Fundamental contributions to research in vision and the brain |
| United States | Gruber Prize in Neuroscience | Gruber Foundation | Discoveries that have advanced the understanding of the nervous system |
| United States | Karl Spencer Lashley Award | American Philosophical Society | Research on the integrative neuroscience of behavior |
| Norway | Kavli Prize | Norwegian Academy of Science and Letters, Ministry of Education and Research (Norway), Kavli Foundation | Outstanding scientific work in the fields of astrophysics, nanoscience and neuroscience |
| Israel | Mathematical Neuroscience Prize | Israel Brain Technologies | Researchers who have significantly advanced the understanding of the neural mechanisms of perception, behavior and thought through the application of mathematical analysis and modeling |
| United States | Metlife Foundation Award for Medical Research in Alzheimer's Disease | MetLife Foundation | Scientific contributions toward a better understanding of the underlying causes, prevention, and treatments of Alzheimer's disease |
| United States | NAS Award in the Neurosciences | National Academy of Sciences | Extraordinary contributions to progress in the fields of neuroscience, including neurochemistry, neurophysiology, neuropharmacology, developmental neuroscience, neuroanatomy, and behavioral and clinical neuroscience |
| Chile | National Prize for Natural Sciences | National Prize of Chile | Natural sciences |
| International | OHBM Replication Award | Organization for Human Brain Mapping | Conducting and disseminating the results of a neuroimaging replication study of exceptional quality and impact |
| United States | Perl-UNC Prize | University of North Carolina at Chapel Hill | Outstanding discoveries and seminal insights in neuroscience |
| United States | Potamkin Prize | Potamkin Foundation, American Academy of Neurology | Achievements in emerging areas of research in Pick's disease, Alzheimer's disease and other dementias |
| United States | Ralph W. Gerard Prize in Neuroscience | Society for Neuroscience | Scientist who has made significant contributions to neuroscience throughout his or her career |
| United States | Swartz Prize | Society for Neuroscience | Individual whose activities have produced a significant cumulative contribution to theoretical models or computational methods in neuroscience or who has made a particularly noteworthy recent advance in theoretical or computational neuroscience |
| Denmark | The Brain Prize | Lundbeck Foundation | Scientists who have distinguished themselves by an outstanding contribution to neuroscience and who are still active in research. (Previously Grete Lundbeck European Brain Research Prize) |
| United States | W. Alden Spencer Award | Columbia University Vagelos College of Physicians and Surgeons | Outstanding research contributions |

== See also ==
- Competitions and prizes in biotechnology
- Lists of awards
- Lists of science and technology awards
- List of biochemistry awards
- List of biomedical science awards
- List of awards in bioinformatics and computational biology
- List of fellows of the AACR Academy
- List of medicine awards
- List of ornithology awards
- List of paleontology awards
