= Spanish Biology Olympiad =

The Spanish Biology Olympiad (Spanish: Olimpiada Española de Biología) is a national competition organised by the Spanish Association of Biology Olympiad since 2005. It is open to students in their final year of high school around the country as well as students of Spanish schools abroad.

This competition has three rounds: the regional stage, national and international. At each stage the three or four winners are selected to participate in the next phase.

In 1985 UNESCO proposed the organisation of the International Biology Olympiad (IBO), with the purpose of promoting the study of biology worldwide and facilitate the exchange of educational experiences in this field. This competition has always included both practical and theoretical examinations.

In Spain the first National Biology Olympiad was organised in the Canary Islands by a group of high school teachers. By that time the Community of Madrid and the Community of Valencia had already celebrated their Regional Olympiad for four or five years. Currently, local phases are held in all the national autonomous communities, including Ceuta and Melilla, and the Spanish centres abroad.

The Spanish Biology Olympiad is registered under number 585 939, Group 1, Section 1 in the National Registry of Associations of the Ministry of the Interior.

The Board of Directors of the Spanish Biology Olympiad (OEB) is elected every four years. The Members are members of the Association OEB and are generally also responsible for organisation of the regional stages. The first Board of the OEB was established in 2009 to work together until 2013, with the following members: José Luis Barba, Maria Jose Lorente, Carmen Díaz, Javier Fernández-Portal, Anselmo Frade, Joaquín Rodríguez, Pedro Nozal and Judith Sanabria.
