= Choi Myong Yong =

South Korean physical chemist (born 1972)

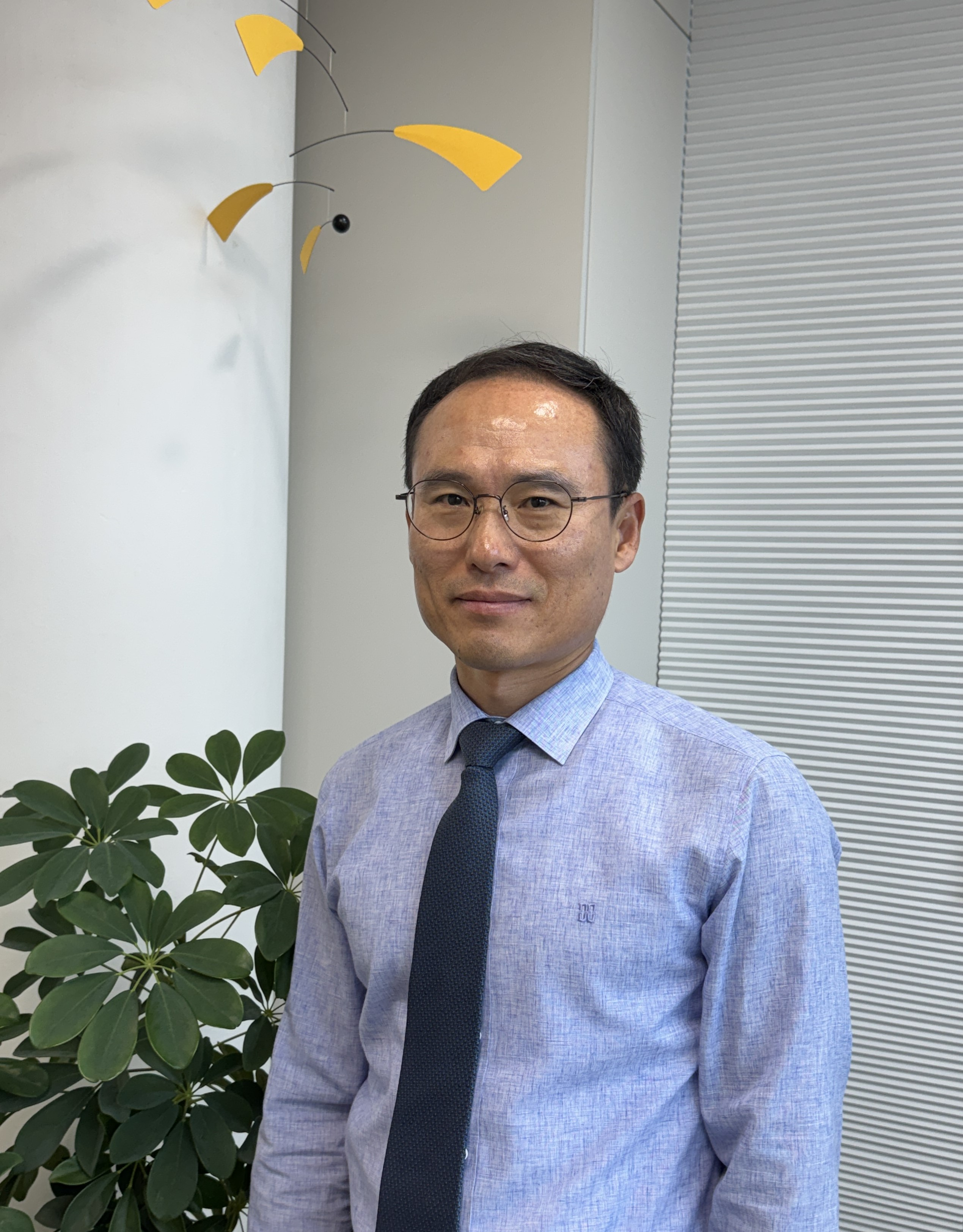
- Born: 1972 (age 53–54); Jinju
- Education: University of Southern California (PostDoc); University of North Carolina at Chapel Hill (Ph.D.); University of Idaho (M.S.); Gyeongsang National University (B.S.)
- Scientific career
- Fields: Laser Photochemistry, Spectroscopy, Electrocatalysis
- Institutions: Department of Chemistry, Gyeongsang National University

Choi Myong Yong (Korean: 최명룡; born 1972) is a South Korean physical chemist specializing in spectroscopy, laser photochemistry, and nanomaterials. He is a professor in the Department of Chemistry at Gyeongsang National University, where he also directs the Core-Facility Center for Photochemistry and Nanomaterials.

== Education and career ==
Choi was born in Jinju, South Korea. He obtained his B.S. in Chemistry from Gyeongsang National University in 1998, followed by an M.S. in Chemistry from the University of Idaho in 2002 and a Ph.D. in Chemistry from the University of North Carolina at Chapel Hill in 2006. He completed postdoctoral research at the University of Southern California before joining Gyeongsang National University in 2007.

At Gyeongsang National University, Choi has held several administrative and academic leadership roles, including Director of Research Facilities, Chair of the Department of Chemistry, and Program Manager at the National Research Foundation of Korea. He has also served in various capacities within the Korean Chemical Society.

== Research ==
Choi's research focuses on the development of laser-assisted methods for synthesizing and characterizing nanomaterials, including metal nanoparticles, nanocomposites, and coordination polymers. His group has developed pulsed laser-based techniques to produce functional materials for use in spectroscopy, catalysis, and environmental applications.

He has contributed to the understanding of gas-phase spectroscopy, photochemical nanomaterial synthesis, and catalyst formation through in-situ spectroscopic analysis. Choi's team has also investigated material design for extreme conditions, such as cryogenic environments, using techniques like in-situ cryogenic X-ray absorption spectroscopy.

== Editor ==
- Associate Editor, eLight, Springer Nature (2024-present)
- Editor, Light: Science & Applications, Nature (2023-present)
- Senior Editor, Journal of Laser Applications, American Institute of Physics (2023-present)
- Associate Editor, Environmental Chemistry Letters, Springer Heidelberg (2022-present)
- Associate Editor, Applied Physics A, Springer (2023-present)

== Awards and honors ==
- Top 50 Excellent Research Achievements Award, Ministry of Education, South Korea (2024)
- KCS Sigma-Aldrich Excellent Chemistry Award (2024)
- Gyeongnam Province Science & Technology Top Award (2023)
- KCS (Physical Chemistry) Kim Myung Soo Award (2022)
- KCS Young Physical Chemist Award (2015)

== Selected publications ==
- Ahn, H., Senthil, R. A., Jung, S., Kumar, A., Ubaidullah, M., & Choi, M. Y. (2025). Pulsed laser-tuned ruthenium@ carbon interface for self-powered hydrogen production via zinc–hydrazine battery coupled hybrid electrolysis. eScience, 100408.
- Theerthagiri, J., Karuppasamy, K., Raj, C. J., Kumari, M. A., Kennedy, L. J., Maia, G., ... & Choi, M. Y. (2025). In situ Spectroscopy: Delineating the mechanistic understanding of electrochemical energy reactions. Progress in Materials Science, 101451.
- Park, J., Theerthagiri, J., Yodsin, N., Limphirat, W., Junmon, P., & Choi, M. Y. (2025). CO2 Laser‐Stabilized Ni‐Co Dual Single‐Atomic Sites for Energy Generation and Ammonia Harvesting. Advanced Materials, 2506137.
- Theerthagiri, J., Karuppasamy, K., Lee, S. J., Shwetharani, R., Kim, H. S., Pasha, S. K., ... & Choi, M. Y. (2022). Fundamentals and comprehensive insights on pulsed laser synthesis of advanced materials for diverse photo-and electrocatalytic applications. Light: Science & Applications, 11(1), 250.
- Lee, Y., Theerthagiri, J., Yodsin, N., Min, A., Moon, C. J., Jungsuttiwong, S., & Choi, M. Y. (2024). Mitigating Intraphase Catalytic‐Domain Transfer via CO2 Laser for Enhanced Nitrate‐to‐Ammonia Electroconversion and Zn‐Nitrate Battery Behavior. Angewandte Chemie International Edition, 63(47), e202413774.
- Begildayeva, T., Theerthagiri, J., Min, A., Moon, C. J., & Choi, M. Y. (2024). Density-controlled metalloporphyrin with mutated surface via pulsed laser for oxidative refining of alcohols to benzoic acid and H2 production using linear tandem electrolysis. Applied Catalysis B: Environment and Energy, 350, 123907.
- Yu, Y., Lee, S. J., Theerthagiri, J., Lee, Y., & Choi, M. Y. (2022). Architecting the AuPt alloys for hydrazine oxidation as an anolyte in fuel cell: Comparative analysis of hydrazine splitting and water splitting for energy-saving H2 generation. Applied Catalysis B: Environmental, 316, 121603.
- Theerthagiri, J., Karuppasamy, K., Raj, C. J., Maia, G., Kumari, M. A., Kennedy, L. J., ... & Choi, M. Y. (2024). Structural engineering of metal oxyhydroxide for electrochemical energy conversion and storage. Coordination Chemistry Reviews, 513, 215880.
- Naik, S. S., Theerthagiri, J., Min, A., Moon, C. J., Lee, S. J., & Choi, M. Y. (2023). Selective furfural conversion via parallel hydrogenation–oxidation on MOF-derived CuO/RuO2/C electrocatalysts via pulsed laser. Applied Catalysis B: Environmental, 339, 123164.
- Oh, Y., Theerthagiri, J., Min, A., Moon, C. J., Yu, Y., & Choi, M. Y. (2024). Pulsed laser interference patterning of transition‐metal carbides for stable alkaline water electrolysis kinetics. Carbon Energy, 6(5), e448.
