= Eppendorf & Science Prize for Neurobiology =

Annual award from Science magazine

The Eppendorf & Science Prize for Neurobiology is a neurobiology prize that is awarded annually by Science magazine (published by American Association for the Advancement of Science) and underwritten by Eppendorf AG, a laboratory equipment and supply company. Entries are reviewed by editors from Science magazine and the top 10% are forwarded to the judging panel. The judging panel is chaired by the Neuroscience Editor of Science and the remaining judges are nominated from the Society for Neuroscience. The award was established in 2002 to promote the work of promising early-career neurobiologists with $25,000 cash award to support their careers. Each applicant must submit a 1000-word essay explaining the focus and motivation for their last three years of work. The winner is awarded $25,000 and the scientist's winning essay is then published in Science (the winning essay and the other finalists' essays are all published on Science Online).

== List (2013–) ==
Award Winners & Finalists
| 2025 | Grand prize winner | Cheng Lyu | “Cheng Lyu’s work focuses on "how olfactory receptor neurons choose one synaptic partner out of all potential candidates” said Peter Stern, Senior Editor at SCIENCE and Prize Jury Chair. “These results provide a profound understanding of the principles of neural circuit assembly.” |
| 2024 | Grand prize winner | Laura Seeholzer | Seeholzer's work focuses on the 'neurophysiology of how our airways sense external threats'. |
| 2023 | Grand prize winner | Marissa Scavuzzo | Scavuzzo's work "focuses on gaining a mechanistic understanding into the functional states of enteric glia in health and disease." |
| 2022 | Grand prize winner | Ann Kennedy | Kennedy's lab "develops computational methods to characterize the structure of complex behavior and model its control by the brain." |
| 2021 | Grand prize winner | Amber L. Alhadeff | Alhadeff "investigates gut-brain signaling and its contributions to feeding and other motivated behaviors." |
| 2020 | Grand prize winner | Christopher Zimmerman | Zimmerman studies "the neural processes underlying motivated behaviors." |
| 2019 | Grand prize winner | Lauren Orefice Outside-in: Rethinking the etiology of autism spectrum disorders | Orefice studies "the development and function of somatosensory circuits and the ways in which somatosensation is altered in developmental disorders." |
| | Finalist | András Szőnyi Conducting memory formation | Szőnyi studies "the cellular mechanisms of learning and memory formation in mice using in vivo imaging and optogenetics." |
| | Finalist | Zvonimir Vrselja Destined for destruction? | Vrselja "focuses on understanding how brain cells react to anoxic injury following circulatory arrest, and how such cells can be structurally and functionally recovered by developing a perfusion technology." |
| 2018 | Grand prize winner | Johannes Kohl Circuits for care | Kohl studies ‘the mechanics of brain activity in mice as they care for their young”. |
| | Finalist | Tomasz Nowakowski Building blocks of the human brain | Nowakowski "seeks to identify the molecular mechanisms underlying cell fate specification and microcircuit formation in the developing cortex." |
| | Finalist | Talia Lerner The effortless custody of automatism | Lerner researches "how dopamine circuits regulate reward learning and habit formation, and how individual differences in dopamine circuit architecture contribute to the risk for mental disorders." |
| 2017 | Grand prize winner | Flavio Donato Assembling the brain from deep within | Donato studies ‘how internally generated network dynamics in the developing cortex support the periodic firing of neurons”. |
| | Finalist | Viviana Gradinaru Overriding sleep | Gradinaru is developing optogenetics, tissue clearing, and viral vectors to probe circuits underlying locomotion, reward, and sleep. |
| | Finalist | Graham H. Diering Sleep on it | Diering specializes in the role of sleep in neural development. |
| 2016 | Grand Prize Winner | Gilad Evrony One brain, many genomes | Evrony's research focuses on developing technologies for studying the brain and neuropsychiatric diseases. |
| | Finalist | Anna Beyeler Parsing reward from aversion | Beyeler explores the neural circuit mechanisms underlying rewarding and aversive memories. |
| | Finalist | Arjun Krishnaswamy Building connections | Krishnaswamy "has been using molecular, electrophysiological, and genetic approaches to learn how developing neurons in the mouse retina choose synaptic targets and establish wiring patterns important for retinal function" |
| 2015 | Grand Prize Winner | Shigeki Watanabe Slow or fast? A tale of synaptic vesicle recycling | Watanabe studies "the mechanisms underlying synaptic vesicle cycle in Caenorhabditis elegans neuromuscular junctions and mouse hippocampal neurons." |
| | Finalist | Julija Krupic Brain crystals | Krupic researches how place cell activity influences animal behavior. |
| | Finalist | Jeremiah Cohen Dopamine and serotonin signals for reward across time scales | Cohen studies the neural circuits underlying reward, mood, and decision-making. |
| 2014 | Grand Prize Winner | Eiman Azim Shortcuts and checkpoints on the road to skilled movement | “Dr. Azim has been exploring the neural basis of skilled movement using molecular, electrophysiological, and behavioral approaches in the mouse to identify and characterize feedback pathways that control goal-directed reaching.” |
| | Finalist | Allyson Friedman Jump-starting natural resilience reverses stress susceptibility | Dr Friedman conducts "research on the ionic and neural circuit mechanisms of susceptibility and resilience to major depressive disorder to identify novel targets for treatment.” |
| | Finalist | Ho Ko Functional organization of synaptic connections in the neocortex | Dr Ko studies "the neural basis of motor control and visual information processing, as well as planning collaborative work with engineers to develop novel biomedical engineering technology." |
| 2013 | Grand Prize Winner | Michael Yartsev Space Bats: Multidimensional Spatial Representation in the Bat | Dr Yartsev “recorded the activity of single neurons from the hippocampal formation of freely behaving and flying bats to study the underlying neural mechanisms of spatial memory and navigation in the mammalian brain….[H]e is currently studying the neural basis of decision-making." |
| | Finalist | Daniel Bendor Play it again, brain | Dr Bender "focuses on how neural ensembles encode perceptual and memory-related information.” |
| | Finalist | Sophie Caron Brains don't play dice–or do they? | Dr Caron "studies how the information gathered through the senses is represented in higher brain centers; in particular, those involved in memory.” |

== See also ==
- List of neuroscience awards
