= Darlington Lecture =

The Darlington Lecture is a lectureship of the John Innes Centre named after its former director, the geneticist C. D. Darlington.

== Lecturers ==
Source: John Innes Centre

- 2001 Alec Jeffreys
- 2002 Kim Nasmyth
- 2004 Nicholas R. Cozzarelli
- 2005 Frank Grosveld
- 2007 Susan R. Wessler, University of Georgia, USA - 'It's alive: activation of virtual rice transposable elements in Arabidopsis and yeast'
- 2008 Ewan Birney, EMBL, Hinxton, Cambridge, UK - 'Ensembl and ENCODE; understanding genomes'
- 2010 Edward Rubin, Lawrence Berkeley National Laboratory
- 2012 David Baulcombe, Department of Plant Sciences, University of Cambridge, UK – ‘RNA silencing and genome defense of plants’
- 2013 Chad Nusbaum, Broad Institute of MIT and Harvard, USA- ‘DNA technology as the engine of scientific discovery’
- 2015 Detlef Weigel, Molecular Biology of Plants & Animals, MPI for Developmental Biology – ‘Origin and consequences of genetic and epigenetic variation in Arabidopsis thaliana and its relatives’

== See also ==
- Bateson Lecture
- Biffen Lecture
- Chatt Lecture
- Haldane Lecture
- List of genetics awards
