= MBC Paper of the Year =

Authors judged annually as writing the best paper on molecular biology

MBoC Paper of the Year
- Description: Awarded to the first author of the paper judged to be the best of the year in the field of molecular biology
- Country: United States
- Presented by: Molecular Biology of the Cell Associate Editors

Chosen by Molecular Biology of the Cell Associate Editors, the MBoC Paper of the Year is awarded to the first author of the paper judged to be the best of the year in the field of molecular biology, from June to May.

== Awardees ==
Source: MBoC

| Year | Winner(s) |
|---|---|
| 2024 | Virginia King, John Brooks, Laura Schenkel |
| 2023 | Alejandro Melero, Reuben Philip, Zachary T. Swider, Luis Bonet-Ponce, Hongjiang Si |
| 2022 | Vilma Jimenez Sabinina |
| 2021 | Colbie R. Chinowsky |
| 2019 | Eric T. Hall |
| 2018 | Jian Zhang |
| 2017 | Nick Davenport |
| 2016 | Lorna E. Young and Ernest G. Heimsath |
| 2015 | Patrick O'Neill |
| 2014 | Sebastian Mana-Capelli |
| 2013 | Brittany J. Belin |
| 2012 | Thomas W. Marshall |
| 2011 | Nicholas O. Deakin |
| 2010 | Abigail S. Haka |
| 2009 | Xue Li Guan, Cleiton M. Souza, Harold Pichler |
| 2008 | Ekaterina Grishchuk |
| 2007 | Ronald Lebofsky |
| 2006 | Melissa Gardner |
| 2005 | Atsuko Uchida |
| 2004 | Keith Kozminski |
| 2003 | Michael Whitfield |
| 2002 | Sandra Kneissel |
| 2001 | Takayuki Sekito |
| 2000 | Gregory Pazour |
| 1999 | Han Htun |
| 1998 | Owais Saife |
| 1997 | Robbin L. DeBiasio |
| 1996 | Gretchen L. Kiser and Ted A. Weinert |
| 1995 | Jere E. Meredith, Jr |

== See also ==
- List of biology awards
