= Cell regulation =

Cell regulation may refer to:

- Cell cycle#Regulation of eukaryotic cell cycle and related processes in cell biology.
- Cell Regulation, the previous name of the journal Molecular Biology of the Cell
