= Korean Chemistry Olympiad =

Korean Chemistry Olympiad(KChO,한국화학올림피아드) is a chemistry olympiad held by Korean Chemical Society (KCS). It is also one of the Korean Science Olympiad. The top four contestants of the KChO can join the International Chemistry Olympiad(IChO).

== History ==
In 1991, Korean Chemical Society held the first KChO. Four high school students representing South Korea joined the 24th IChO the next year, which was held in United States. KChO was held 27 times. In 2018, 50th IChO was held at Slovakia, Czech Republic.

== Business Background and Supports ==
=== Business Background ===
The KCS holds the KChO to make South Korea win the IChO and through four seasonal schools, KCS will find who are gifted in chemistry and educate them to play an important role in development of chemistry in Korean society.

=== Supports ===
Korea Foundation for the Science and Creativity, LG Chem, and Korea Dow Chemical Company supports the KChO.

== Process ==
=== On-line questions ===
KCS Uploads about five to six questions every two weeks on KChO website. Students who are studying for KChO can download the questions and try to solve them. Anyone can download the answers and official solutions there after a week. Even if the person is not joining the KChO, the person can download the questions and answers at the KChO website.

=== Test 1 ===
After the on-line questions, students will take a test about what they have learned while solving the on-line questions. First grade students in high school take this test. The questions are based on basic chemistry. The test can determine how much the students understand basic chemistry. 80 well-ranked students can join the Summer school 1. About one organic chemistry questions appear in the test. All the tests are held in Konkuk University.

=== Summer school 1 ===
80 people who got a good score will join the Summer School 1, which is usually held far away from Seoul. In the school, students learn basic chemistry for two weeks and there isn't any experiment classes. When the school is almost finished, students take an exam. One person gets a Best Graduation, 24 people get a Merit, and some of the rest get an Honorable Mention. 25 people-Best Graduation and Merit-can join the Winter School 1 without Test 2. In 2018, the Summer School will be held at Daegu Gyeongbuk Institute of Science and Technology.

=== Test 2 ===
On-line Questions are uploaded again after the Summer School. The leftovers of the Summer School and other people who didn't join the Summer School have to take this test to join the Winter School 1. First grade students in the high school take this test. In this test, Organic Chemistry questions will appear more often than the test 1. 25 well-ranked students can join the Winter School 1.

=== Winter school 1 ===
25 people directly from the Summer School 1 and 25 people from the Test 2 will join the Winter School 1, which is usually held near Seoul. In the school, students stay two weeks; studying theories in the morning and learning experiments in afternoon. Half of them of theories are related to basic chemistry and the other half will be related to Organic Chemistry. One person gets a Best Graduation, 19 people get a Merit, and some of the rest get an Honorable Mention. 20 people-Best Graduation and Merit-can join the Summer School 2 without Test 3.

=== Test 3 ===
On-line Questions are uploaded again after the Winter School. The leftovers of the Winter School and other people who didn't join the Winter School have to take this test to join the Summer School 2. Second grade students in the high school take this test. In this test, almost half of these questions will be related to Organic Chemistry. 20 well-ranked students can join the Winter School 2.

=== Summer school 2 ===
20 people directly from the Winter School 1 and 20 people from the Test 3 will join the Summer School 2, which is held at the same place with Summer School 1. In the school, students stay two weeks; studying theories in the morning and learning experiments in afternoon. Almost of the theories are related to Organic Chemistry. One person gets a Best Graduation, 14 people get a Merit, and some of the leftovers get an Honorable Mention. 15 people-Best Graduation and Merit-can join the Winter School 2. These students have to take the Test 4, but the result doesn't matter of choosing students joining the Test 4. They can directly go to the Winter School 2.

=== Test 4 ===
On-line Questions are being uploaded again after the Summer School. All students-even the directly connected ones-have to take this test to become the final representatives. Second grade students in the high school take this test. This test is counted 20 percent when KCS chooses the final representatives of South Korea. In this test, most of the questions are related to Organic Chemistry. 15 students directly connected from the Summer School 2 and 15 students who got a good score in the Test 4 can join the Winter School 2.

=== Winter school 2 ===
15 people directly from the Summer School 2 and 15 people from the Test 4 will join the Winter School 2, which is held at the same place with Winter School 2. In the school, students stay only a week; studying theories in the morning and learning experiments in afternoon. Almost all of the theories are related to Organic Chemistry. The test held in this school will count 80 percent when KCS chooses the final representatives of South Korea. One person will get a Best Graduation, about 10 people will get a Merit, and some of the rest will get an Honorable Mention. All the forty people can take the Korean Representative Choosing Exam(Final KChO).

== Final representative selection process ==
After graduating the Winter school 2, students take Final KChO. It is held on January or February. It is divided into two parts; Theories and Experiments. Organic Chemistry and Inorganic Chemistry questions in the theory are important for choosing the representatives. In the experiment, students solve one Organic Chemistry experiment and one Quantitative Chemistry experiment. Four students who got a high score represents South Korea in IChO. If all the four representatives are the same gender, the student who got a highest score between the other gender who ranked eighth or higher becomes the representative instead of the fourth student.

== Representatives of IChO of Korea ==
2020	Junha Park (Silver)	Minjeong Lee (Silver)	Mugyeom Jeon (Gold, 2nd in the world)	Junha Hong (Gold)	2 Gold, 2 Silver
2019	Juhan Hong (Gold)	Jiwoo Kim (Gold)	Ilkyu Choi (Gold)	Hyukyu Choi (Gold)	4 Gold
2018	Jinyeong Kim (Gold)	Chaerin Kim (Gold)	Yujin Bang (Gold, 3rd place individual)	Joonhwan Won (Silver)	3 Gold, 1 Silver
2017	Hanjun Lee (Gold)	Geumah Kwak (Gold)	Jaehyeon Kim (Silver)	Joonwon Son (Silver)	2 Gold, 2 Silver
2016	Juno Nam (Gold)	Junha Park (Gold)	Hyeongseop Jeon (Gold)	Heejun Son (Silver)	3 Gold, 1 Silver
2015	Soyoung Lee (Gold)	Taehyeon Kim (Gold)	Sangwon Lee (Gold)	Yongjun Lee (Gold)	4 Gold
2014	Eunsong Lee (Gold)	Seunghwan Won (Silver)	Wonki Hong (Silver)	Hyunwoo Lee (Silver)	1 Gold, 3 Silver
2013	Donghan Shin (Gold)	Chiwon Hwang (Gold)	Joonyeong Hong (Gold)	Jinwook Yoo (Silver)	3 Gold, 1 Silver
2012	Minwoo Bae (Gold, 2nd in the world)	Yookyeong Jeon (Gold)	Jiho Park (Gold)	Hokyeong Lee (Gold)	4 Gold
2011	Hyeonseok Lee (Gold, 4th in the world)	Jaewon Choi (Gold)	Yongbeom Kim (Gold)	Yujin Lim (Gold)	4 Gold
2010	Pilkeun Jang (Gold, 3rd in the world)	Jaehyeon Lim (Gold)	Hyeonjae Lee (Gold)	Wonjae Kim (Silver)	3 Gold, 1 Silver
2009	Dodam Kim (Gold)	Jihun Kim (Gold)	Icheol Oh (Gold)	Yeongseok Cha (Bronze)	3 Gold, 1 Bronze
2008	Sunku Kwak (Gold)	Jaehoon Jeong (Gold)	Wooje Cho (Gold)	Donghwan Kim (Bronze)	3 Gold, 1 Bronze
2007	Jaesoo Kim (Gold)	Taegon Oh (Gold)	Changho Lee (Gold)	Jongsoo Yoon (Silver)	3 Gold, 1 Silver
2006	Hwan Bae (Gold, 1st in the world)	Joonhong Park (Gold)	Taehee Hong (Gold)	SeungWan Nam (Silver)	3 Gold, 1 Silver
2005	Byeongkil Kim (Gold)	Joonhyeong Kim (Gold)	Sangwon Noh (Gold)	Sanghyun Lee (Gold)	4 Gold
2004	Yeongwoo Park (Gold)	Hyemin Jang (Gold)	Junsu Ham (Gold)	Gyeore Han (Gold)	3 Gold, 1 Silver
2003	Yongjin Kim (Gold)	Byeongok Na (Gold)	Jiho Lee (Gold)	Seungpil Jang (Gold)	2 Gold, 2 Silver
2002	Minhyeong Kim (Gold)	Jonghyeok Lee (Gold)	Inseop Kim (Silver)	Yongjin Kim (Silver)	2 Gold, 2 Silver
2001	Dohyeong Kim (Gold)	Hyeonwoo Park (Gold)	Joonhwa Lee (Gold)	Sanghyeok Song (Silver)	3 Gold, 1 Silver
2000	Yeongseok Joo (Gold)	Seunghwan Lee (Silver)	Giwook Hwang (Bronze)	Donghwan Kim (Bronze)	1 Gold, 1 Silver, 2 Bronze
1999	Seonghwan Oh (Gold)	Dongkyun Ha (Gold)	Yeongseok Joo (Gold)	Giyeong Park (Silver)	3 Gold, 1 Silver
1998	Sangwoo Sim (Gold)	Jaho Lee (Gold)	Dongho Lee (Gold)	Taeksu Kim (Gold)	2 Gold, 2 Silver
1997	Sihyeok Kang (Gold)	Samuel Kim (Gold)	Kyeonghwan Kim (Bronze)	Sangwoo Sim (Bronze)	2 Gold, 2 Bronze
1996	Hyeseon Park (Silver)	Beomjeong Yang (Bronze)	Byeongkuk Song (Bronze)	Samuel Kim (Gold)	1 Silver, 3 Bronze
1995	Seungbin Bae (Silver)	Kihyeon Park (Bronze)	Sangmin Lim (Bronze)	Changho Cho	1 Silver, 2 Bronze
1994	Seungwoo Kim (Gold)	Jeongwon Kim (Silver)	Sangil Han (Silver)	Jinwoo Park (Honor)	1 Gold, 2 Silver, 1 Honorable Mention
1993	Hyeongjin Park (Silver)	Hyeonmin Kang (Bronze)	Howoong Lee (Bronze)	Soohyeok Choi (Bronze)	1 Silver, 3 Bronze
1992	Taeyeong Oh (Bronze)	Munho Na (Bronze)	Cheonho Park (Bronze)	Sangmin Park	3 Bronze
