= Silvia Pressel =

British botanist

- Alma mater: Queen Mary University of London
- Employer: Natural History Museum; Queen Mary University of London (2007–2011)
- Website: www.nhm.ac.uk/our-science/departments-and-staff/staff-directory/silvia-pressel.html

Silvia Pressel is a botanist and head of the LS Algae, Fungi and Plants Division of the Natural History Museum, London.

She is a joint recipient (with James Clarkson) of the Linnean Society's 2008 Irene Manton Prize for the "best thesis in botany examined for a doctorate of philosophy during a single academic year" in the United Kingdom. She completed her PhD, Experimental studies of bryophyte cell biology, conservation, physiology and systematics, at Queen Mary University of London (QMUL) in 2007. She was a Leverhulme Trust Early Career Research Fellow. She is also the recipient of the Linnean Society's Trail-Crisp Award for 2015, for her work in microscopy.

From 2007 to 2010 she lectured at QMUL.

She describes her research as integrating "expertise in bryophyte systematics, evolution, anatomy and in-vitro culturing to tackle major questions on the origin and evolution of key innovations of land plants including stomata, cuticles, desiccation-tolerance and fungal symbioses".

She is an editor of the journal Annals of Botany. and is a member of the governing council of the Linnean Society.

She is co-author of the field guide Mosses, Liverworts and Hornworts of Ascension Island.

== Works ==
- Pressel, Silvia; Matcham, Howard W.; Supple, Catherine; Duckett, Jeffrey G. (2018). Mosses, Liverworts and Hornworts of Ascension Island. Pisces Publications. ISBN 978-1-874357-80-3.
