= Linnean Tercentenary Medal =

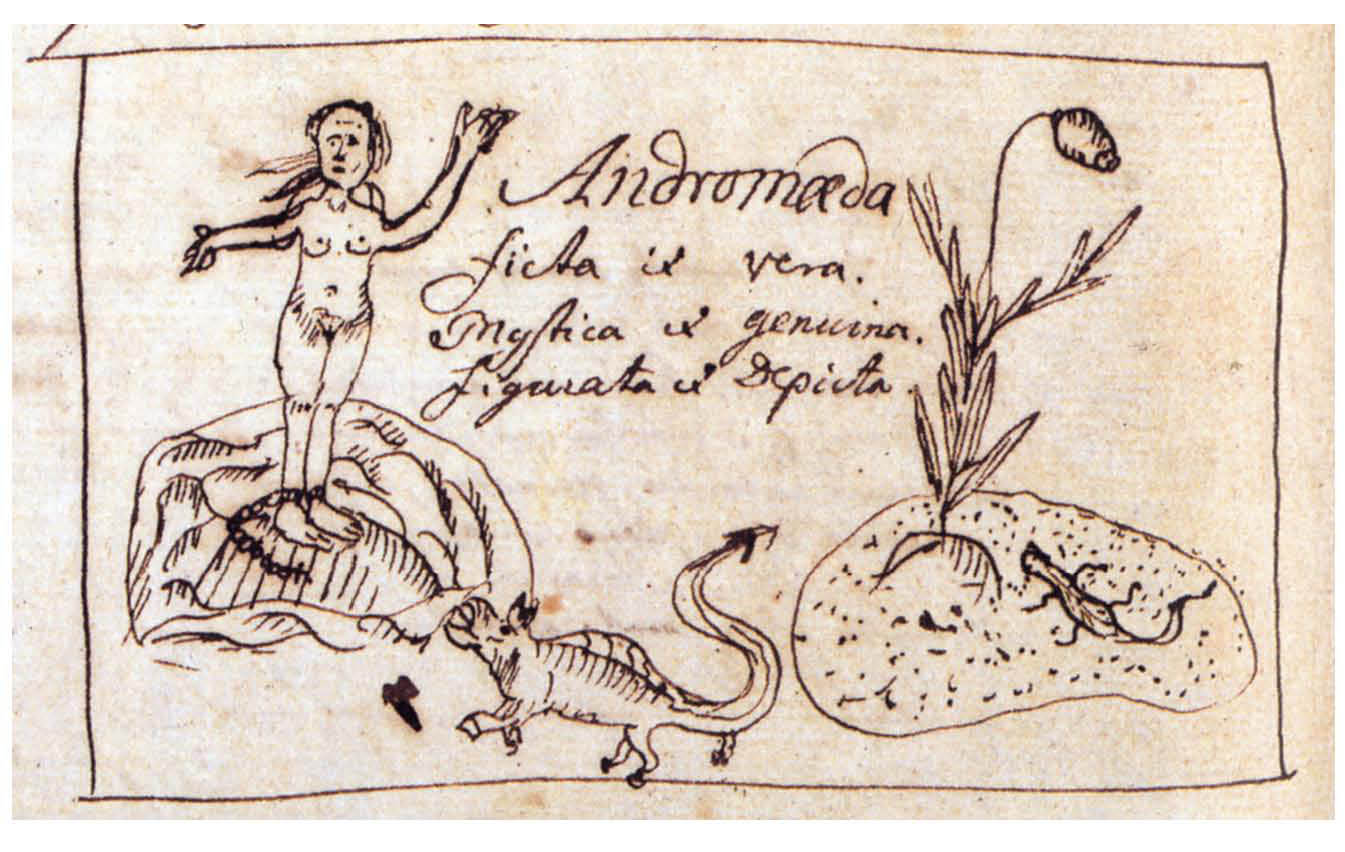
Linnaeus' original Andromeda drawing

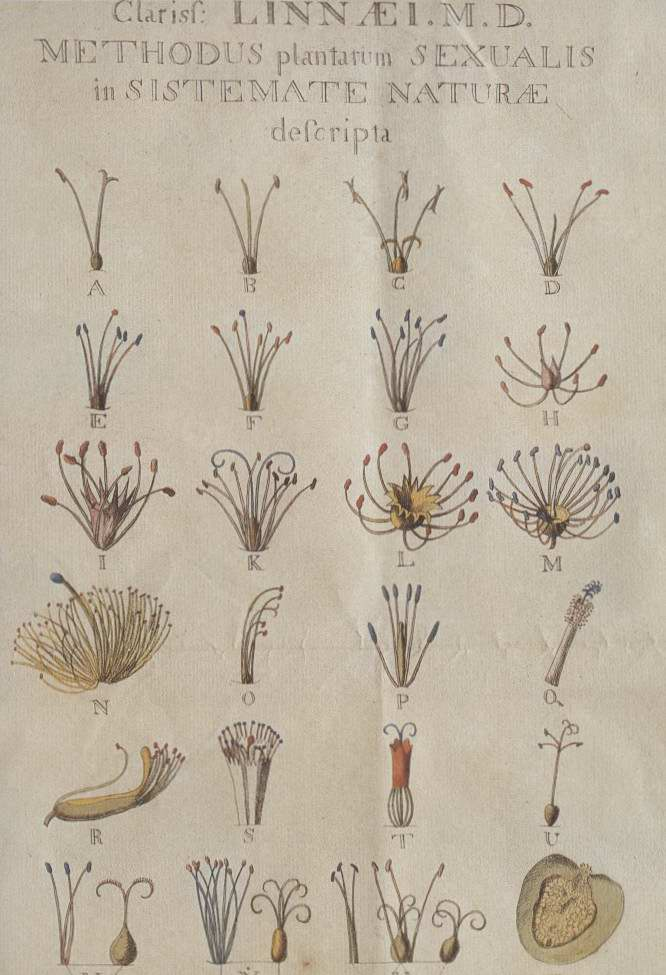
Linnaeus' sexual system for plant classification from Systema Naturae

The Linnean Tercentenary Medal was commissioned in 2007 by the Linnean Society to commemorate the tercentenary of the birth of Carl Linnaeus. Recipients were in two categories: Silver Medal and Bronze Medal, for outstanding contributions to natural history.

The front of the medal features an illustration by Linnaeus of Andromeda (mythology) next to one of the plant he named Andromeda, from his 1732 expedition to Lapland and on the back, a spiral design made from illustrations taken from Systema Naturae.

== Silver Medal ==
- Sir David Attenborough CBE, Hon. FLS, FRS
- Professor Steve Jones FRS, FLS
- Professor Edward O. Wilson FMLS, ForMemRS

== Bronze Medal ==
- Ms Gina Douglas FLS
- Dr Jenny Edmonds FLS
- Professor Carl-Olof Jacobsen FLS
- Professor Bengt Jonsell FLS
- Dr Martyn Rix FLS
- Mr Nigel Rowland FLS
- Ms Elaine Shaughnessy FLS

== See also ==
- List of biology awards
