= Erzherzog Rainer-Medaille =

The Erzherzog Rainer-Medaille of the Kaiserlich-königlichen zoologisch-botanischen Gesellschaft in Wien (now "Zoologisch-Botanischen Gesellschaft in Österreich") was awarded annually to a scientist in commemoration of Archduke Rainer of Austria (1827–1913).

== Rainer Medalists ==
- 1912: Erwin Baur, German botanist (1875-1933)
- 1912: Theodor Boveri, German geneticist (1862-1915)
- 1914: Ross Granville Harrison, American biologist (1870-1959)
- 1914: George Reber Wieland, American paleontologist (1865–1953)
- 1921: Hans Winkler, German botanist (1877-1945)
- 1921: Othenio Abel, Paleontologist, paleobiologist (1875-1946)
- 1923: Nils Heribert-Nilsson, Swedish botanist and geneticist (1883-1955)
- 1923: Karl von Frisch, German-Austrian ethologist (1886-1982)
- 1925: Fritz von Wettstein, Czech-Austrian botanist (1895-1945)
- 1925: Richard Hesse, German zoologist
- 1927: August Thienemann, German zoologist (1882-1960)
- 1927: Gunnar Vilhelm Täckholm, botanist (1891-1933)
- 1929: Erik Stensiö, Swedish ichthyologist
- 1929: Fritz Knoll, Austrian botanist (1883-1981)
- 1931: D. M. S. Watson, British paleontologist (1886–1973)
- 1931: Werner Lüdi, Swiss botanist (1888-1968)
- 1933: Heinrich Walter, German-Russian botanist and eco-physiologist (1898-1989)
- 1933: Paul Buchner, German zoologist
- 1935: Lothar Geitler, Austrian botanist and cytologist (1899-1990)
- 1935: Jürgen Wilhelm Harms, German zoologist
- 1937: Sven P. Ekman, Swedish ostracodologist (1876-1964)
- 1937: Karl Schnarf, botanist (1879-1947)

== See also ==
- List of biology awards
