= Budehaven Community School =

Location
- Valley Road; Bude, Cornwall, EX23 8DQ; England
- Coordinates: 50.82576°N 4.53487°W

Information
- Type: Foundation school
- Local authority: Cornwall Council
- Department for Education URN: 112045 Tables
- Ofsted: Reports
- Headteacher: Dominic Wilkes
- Gender: Coeducational
- Age: 11 to 19
- Enrolment: 1,215 as of January 2023
- Website: http://www.budehaven.cornwall.sch.uk/

Budehaven Community School is a coeducational foundation secondary school and sixth form, located in Bude in the English county of Cornwall.

Previously a community school administered by Cornwall Council, in November 2012 Budehaven became a foundation trust school as part of the Bude Communities’ Schools’ Trust. The trust includes Bude Infant School, Bude Junior School, Jacobstow Community Primary School, Kilkhampton Junior and Infant School, Marhamchurch CE Primary School, St Marks CE Primary School, Stratton Primary School and Whitstone Community Primary School.

Budehaven Community School offers GCSEs and BTECs as programmes of study for pupils, while students in the sixth form have the option to study from a range of A-levels and further BTECs. Budehaven Leisure Centre is located next to the school, and pupils at the school have full use of the sports facilities during the day, while the centre is open to the local community in the evenings and weekends.

== Notable alumni ==
- Sharon Robinson, Antarctic researcher known for her work on climate change and bryophytes
- Phil Vickery, former rugby union player and member of the England squad
