= Korean Biology Olympiad =

The Korean Biology Olympiad (KBO) is a biology olympiad held by Korean Biology Educational Society. The top four finalists become eligible to join the International Biology Olympiad.

== See also ==
- List of biology awards
