= Roshd Biological Education =

- Editor-in-Chief: Dr. Mohammad Karamudini
- Publisher: Bureau for Educational Complementary Publications, Organization for Educational Research and Planning, Ministry of Education, Iran
- Categories: Science education
- Frequency: Quarterly
- Circulation: 10,000
- First issue: 1985
- Country: Iran
- Language: Persian
- Website: mags.roshd.ir/zist
- ISSN: 1606-9153

Roshd Biological Education is a quarterly science educational magazine covering recent developments in biology and biology education for a biology teacher Persian -speaking audience. Founded in 1985, it is published by The Teaching Aids Publication Bureau, Organization for Educational Planning and Research, Ministry of Education, Iran. Roshd Biological Education has an editorial board composed of Iranian biologists, experts in biology education, science journalists and biology teachers. It is read by both biology teachers and students, as a way of launching innovations and new trends in biology education, and helping biology teachers to teach biology in better and more effective ways.

== Magazine layout ==
As of Autumn 2012, the magazine is laid out as follows:

- Editorial—often offering a view of point from editor in chief on an educational and/or biological topics.
- Explore— New research methods and results on biology and/or education.
- World— Reports and explores on biological education worldwide.
- In Brief—Summaries of research news and discoveries.
- Trends—showing how new technology is altering the way we live our lives.
- Point of View—Offering personal commentaries on contemporary topics.
- Essay or Interview—often with a pioneer of a biological and/or educational researcher or an influential scientific educational leader.
- Muslim Biologists—Short histories of Muslim Biologists.
- Environment—An article on Iranian environment and its problems.
- News and Reports—Offering short news and reports events on biology education.
- In Brief—Short articles explaining interesting facts.
- Questions and Answers—Questions about biology concepts and their answers.
- Book and periodical Reviews—About new publication on biology and/or education.
- Reactions—Letter to the editors.

== Editorial staff ==
Mohammad Karamudini, editor in chief

== History ==
Roshd Biological Education started in 1985 together with many other magazines in other science and art. The first editor was Dr. Nouri-Dalooi, the second editor was Mr. Hossein Daneshfar and the third and present editor is Dr. Mohammad KARAMUDINI. The 87th issue is published in summer 2012.

== See also ==
- List of scientific journals
