= Irene Manton Prize =

Learned society prize for UK doctoral thesis in botany

The Irene Manton Prize of the Linnean Society of London is awarded annually for the "best thesis in botany examined for a doctorate of philosophy during a single academic year" in the United Kingdom.

The prize is named in honour of Irene Manton FRS, the first female president of the Linnean Society of London. She pioneered the biological use of electron microscopy. Her work revealed the structure of the flagellum and cilia, which are central to many systems of cellular motility.

== Recipients of the Irene Manton Prize ==
- Jamie B. Thompson (2025), University of Bath; Tempo and drivers of angiosperm diversification
- Tin Hang Hung (2024) University of Oxford; Ecological genomics and adaptation of rosewoods Dalbergia cochinchinensis and D. oliveri for conservation and restoration
- Brogan Harris (2023) University of Bristol; A phylogenetic investigation into the evolutionary history of stomata and land plants
- Bruno Pok Man Ngou (2022) University of East Anglia & The Sainsbury Laboratory; Roles and mechanisms of effector-triggered immunity in plant disease resistance
- Sophie Harrington (2021) University of East Anglia; Understanding the molecular and genetic mechanisms regulating senescence in wheat
- James Clark (2020) University of Bristol; Whole genome duplication and the evolution of the land plant body plan
- Leanne Melbourne (2019) University of Bristol; The effect of environmental change on the structure, composition and subsequently the structural integrity of un-attached corallines
- Sandy Hetherington (2018) University of Oxford; Evolution and morphology of lycophyte root systems
- Shanna Ludwig (2015) University of Bristol; Ecological and evolutionary genetics, focusing on reproductive biology and speciation in diploid and polyploid Sorbus populations
- Simon Renny-Byfield (2014) Queen Mary, University of London; Evolution of repetitive DNA in angiosperms: Examples from Nicotiana
- Janine Pendleton (2013) University of Sheffield; Carboniferous plants and spores from the Bristol Coalfield
- Alexander S T Papadopulos (2012) Imperial College London
- Tiina Sarkinen (2011)
- Christopher Thorogood (2010) University of Bristol
- Chris Yesson (2009)
- James Clarkson and Silvia Pressel (2008)
- Lionel Navarro (2007) University of East Anglia; Plant innate immunity and bacterial pathogenesis
- Yuki Yasumura (2006) University of Oxford
- Alex Wortley (2005)
- Mark Clegg (2003)
- Julie King (2002)
- Alison Gwen Roberts (2001)
- James Edward Richardson (2000)
- Melissa Spielman (1999)
- Alexander Weir (1998)
- Colin Edward Hughes (1997)
- Dorothy Steane (1996)
- Sally Glockling (1995)
- William Justin Goodrich (1993)
- Sharon Anita Robinson and Robert Winning Scotland (1992)
- not awarded (1991)
- Christine Masterson (1990)

== See also ==
- List of biology awards
