= Trail-Crisp Award =

The Trail-Crisp Award, of the Linnean Society of London, was established in 1966 and is an amalgamation of The Trail Award and The Crisp Award (both founded in 1910). The Trail-Crisp Award is presented at intervals "in recognition of an outstanding contribution to biological microscopy that has been published in the UK".

== Recipients ==
=== Trail Award ===
- 1915: Leonard Doncaster
- 1920: Helen Gwynne-Vaughan
- 1930: Kathleen Bever Blackburn
- 1937: Carl Pantin
- 1948: Honor Fell
- 1954: Irene Manton
- 1960: L.E.R. Picken

=== Trail-Crisp Award ===
- 2014: Silvia Pressel
- 2015: not awarded
- 2016: Imogen Sparks
- 2017: Johannes Girstmair
- 2018: Andrew Chick
- 2021: Dakota McCoy
- 2022: Frieda Christie
- 2024: Justyna J. Miszkiewicz

== See also ==
- List of biology awards
