= Ali Daneshfar =

Iranian chemist

- علی دانشفر
- Scientific career
- Fields: chemistry
- Institutions: Lorestan University, Ilam University

Ali Daneshfar is an Iranian chemist and Professor of Analytical Chemistry at Lorestan University. He is among the top 1% most-cited scientists in the world. He previously taught at Ilam University.

== Select publications ==
- Optimization of the ultrasonic assisted removal of methylene blue by gold nanoparticles loaded on activated carbon using experimental design methodology
- Kinetics, thermodynamics and equilibrium evaluation of direct yellow 12 removal by adsorption onto silver nanoparticles loaded activated carbon
- Development of dispersive micro-solid phase extraction based on micro and nano sorbents
- A green ultrasonic-assisted liquid–liquid microextraction based on deep eutectic solvent for the HPLC-UV determination of ferulic, caffeic and cinnamic acid from olive, almond ...
- Comparison of silver and palladium nanoparticles loaded on activated carbon for efficient removal of Methylene blue: Kinetic and isotherm study of removal process
- Optimization of the combined ultrasonic assisted/adsorption method for the removal of malachite green by gold nanoparticles loaded on activated carbon: experimental design
