= Lauren Orefice =

American neuroscientist

- Education: Boston College; Georgetown University; Harvard Medical School
- Known for: Role of peripheral neuron hyperactivity in ASD symptoms
- Awards: 2019 Eppendorf & Science Prize for Neurobiology, 2018 Regeneron Prize for Creative Innovation, 2016 Notable Papers of 2016 Simons Foundation Spotlight
- Scientific career
- Fields: Neuroscience
- Workplaces: Harvard Medical School

Lauren Orefice is an American neuroscientist and assistant professor in the Department of Molecular Biology at Massachusetts General Hospital and in the Department of Genetics at Harvard Medical School. Orefice has made innovative discoveries about the role of peripheral nerves and sensory hypersensitivity in the development of Autism-like behaviors. Her research now focuses on exploring the basic biology of somatosensory neural circuits for both touch and gastrointestinal function in order to shed light on how peripheral sensation impacts brain development and susceptibility to diseases like Autism Spectrum Disorders.

== Early life and education ==
Orefice pursued her undergraduate degree at Boston College. She majored in biology and worked in the lab of Stephen C. Heinrichs. She studied the neurobiological underpinning of seizure susceptibility in mice and published a first author paper in Epilepsy and Behavior. She used mouse models of idiopathic epilepsy (IE) to explore how increased parental investment impacted seizure susceptibility in offspring with IE. She strikingly found that when pups with a genetic susceptibility to seizures are biparentally reared, this decreases the time to first seizure compared to pups that are only reared by a dam. The increased exposure to parenting, by 350% compared to uniparental rearing, was a form of stressor which impacted seizure susceptibility.

After completing her Bachelors of Science, Orefice pursued her graduate work in neuroscience at Georgetown University in 2008. She worked under the mentorship of Baoji Xu studying the role of BDNF in dendritic spine morphogenesis in the hippocampus. Her first paper in the lab highlighted the differential roles of two types of BDNF mRNA in spine growth and maturation. She found a form of BDNF mRNA with a short 3’ untranslated region (UTR) that was present in the soma and promoted spine formation. She also found a second form in the dendrites that is locally translated and has a long 3’ UTR and seems to play a role in promoting spine head growth and pruning. Orefice then further probed how dendritic BDNF exerts its effects on synapse maturation and pruning. She found that neuronal activity promoted the translation of local BDNF mRNA in the dendrites, while translation of BDNF in the soma is independent of action potentials. Further, neuronal activity also promotes the secretion of proBDNF from the dendrite which then effects pruning via binding to the p75NTR receptor. This work fascinatingly highlighted the distinct pathways and translational regulation of somatic versus dendritic BDNF. Orefice completed her graduate training in 2013.

== Career and research ==
In 2014, Orefice pursued her postdoctoral work in the lab of David Ginty at Harvard Medical School. In the Ginty Lab, Orefice studied the peripheral somatosensory system, a substantial change from her prior work in the central nervous system. Orefice reported in an interview with Harvard Medical School that this large field change helped her to see that broad research concepts and skills can easily be transferred between fields and are critical in long-term development as a scientist. During her postdoctoral work, Orefice discovered that dysfunction at the level of peripheral somatosensory neurons accounted for touch over-reactivity in ASD models as well as the development of both social defects and anxiety like behavior. She later targeted hyperactivity of peripheral neurons using an agonist for inhibitory neurons and was able to ameliorate ASD-like behaviors in rodent models of ASD.

In 2019, Orefice was promoted to Assistant Professor in the Department of Molecular Biology at Massachusetts General Hospital as well as assistant professor in the Department of Genetics at Harvard University. She is the principal investigator of the Orefice Lab and her research focuses on understanding the basic biology of the somatosensory circuits that mediate touch and sensations within the gastrointestinal system. She is particularly interested in exploring the development and function of peripheral sensory neurons that innervate internal organs since these might mediate the brain-gut connection to influence behavior and brain-related disease. They further explore how somatosensory processing is aberrant in ASD and how GI dysfunction in ASD might be mediated at the level of the periphery. Lastly, the lab hopes to perform translational work using patient derived iPSCs to move their findings into cellular models and hopefully closer to affecting patients in the clinic.

=== Peripheral somatosensory neuron dysfunction and autism spectrum disorder ===
During her postdoctoral work, Orefice made critical discoveries surrounding the role of the peripheral sensory nervous system in the development of autism-like behaviors. It is known that tactile sensitivity is often aberrant in both humans with autism spectrum disorder (ASD) as well as mouse models of ASD. Orefice sought to understand which somatosensory neural circuits were dysfunctional in ASD mouse models as well as how peripheral somatosensory dysfunction contributes to disordered behavioral phenotypes. She deleted ASD-related genes (MeCP2 and Gabrb3) in peripheral neurons and found that absence of these genes, in peripheral tactile neurons only, during development lead to defects in social interaction and anxiety-like behavior later in life. However, when these genes were deleted in the forebrain or during adulthood, there was no somatosensory over-reactivity. When MeCP2 was selectively expressed in only the peripheral sensory neurons, this was enough to restore defects in touch sensitivity, social behavior, and anxiety. Overall, her findings pointing to the periphery as the site at which these ASD mutations exert their influence on sensory over-reactivity and its contribution to ASD phenotypes.

Orefice followed these findings to explore the possibility of targeting the peripheral somatosensory neurons therapeutically in ASD models. Since she found that peripheral sensory neuron hyperactivity in development was linked to ASD-like behaviors in adulthood as well as impairments in specific brain circuits, Orefice treated ASD models with peripherally restricted GABAa receptor agonists to increase inhibition at the level of mechanosensory neurons. Peripheral action of this drug led to decreased hypersensitivity and improved some brain circuit dysfunction, anxiety-like behaviors, and social impairments but not the memory and motor defects associated with ASD. Her work points to the potential in modulating peripheral neurons, instead of having to target the brain, as a potential therapy for ASD.

== Awards and honors ==
- 2020 Pew Biomedical Scholar
- 2020 Searle Scholar
- 2019 Eppendorf & Science Prize for Neurobiology
- 2019 Smith Family Award
- 2019 Klingenstein-Simons Fellowship Award in Neuroscience
- 2018 Regeneron Prize for Creative Innovation
- 2016 Notable Papers of 2016 Simons Foundation Spotlight

== Select publications ==
- Orefice, Lauren L.; Mosko, Jacqueline R.; Morency, Danielle T.; Wells, Michael F.; Tasnim, Aniqa; Mozeika, Shawn M.; Ye, Mengchen; Chirila, Anda M.; Emanuel, Alan J.; Rankin, Genelle; Fame, Ryann M.; Lehtinen, Maria K.; Feng, Guoping; Ginty, David D. (2019). "Targeting Peripheral Somatosensory Neurons to Improve Tactile-Related Phenotypes in ASD Models". Cell. 178 (4). Elsevier BV: 867–886.e24. doi:10.1016/j.cell.2019.07.024. ISSN 0092-8674. PMC 6704376. PMID 31398341.
- Orefice, Lauren L.; Zimmerman, Amanda L.; Chirila, Anda M.; Sleboda, Steven J.; Head, Joshua P.; Ginty, David D. (2016). "Peripheral Mechanosensory Neuron Dysfunction Underlies Tactile and Behavioral Deficits in Mouse Models of ASDs". Cell. 166 (2). Elsevier BV: 299–313. doi:10.1016/j.cell.2016.05.033. ISSN 0092-8674. PMC 5567792. PMID 27293187.
- Orefice, Lauren L.; Shih, Chien-Cheng; Xu, Haifei; Waterhouse, Emily G.; Xu, Baoji (2016). "Control of spine maturation and pruning through proBDNF synthesized and released in dendrites". Molecular and Cellular Neuroscience. 71. Elsevier BV: 66–79. doi:10.1016/j.mcn.2015.12.010. ISSN 1044-7431. PMC 4761458. PMID 26705735.
- Orefice, L. L.; Waterhouse, E. G.; Partridge, J. G.; Lalchandani, R. R.; Vicini, S.; Xu, B. (10 July 2013). "Distinct Roles for Somatically and Dendritically Synthesized Brain-Derived Neurotrophic Factor in Morphogenesis of Dendritic Spines". Journal of Neuroscience. 33 (28). Society for Neuroscience: 11618–11632. doi:10.1523/jneurosci.0012-13.2013. ISSN 0270-6474. PMC 3724547. PMID 23843530.
- Orefice, Lauren L.; Heinrichs, Stephen C. (2008). "Paternal care paradoxically increases offspring seizure susceptibility in the El mouse model of epilepsy". Epilepsy & Behavior. 12 (2). Elsevier BV: 234–241. doi:10.1016/j.yebeh.2007.09.004. ISSN 1525-5050. PMID 17964859. S2CID 20540536.
