= Sharon Robinson (physiologist) =

Antarctic researcher

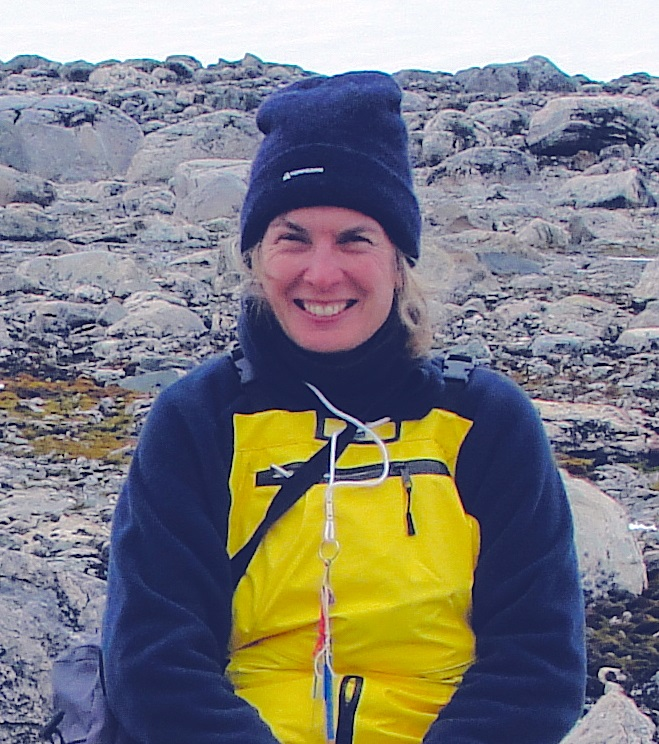
- Sharon Robinson at Casey Station
- Born: 1961 (age 64–65)
- Education: University College London
- Known for: Antarctic ecology Climate change
- Scientific career
- Fields: Plant Ecophysiology; Bryology; Global Change Biology
- Workplaces: University of Wollongong
- Website: www.professarobinson.com

Sharon Anita Robinson AM is an Antarctic researcher known for her work on climate change and bryophytes.

She is deputy-director of science implementation and UOW node lead of the Securing Antarctica’s Environmental Future program, a special research initiative on excellence in antarctic science from the Australian Research Council, awarded $36 million over a seven year period (2021-2028). She is also the dean of researcher development and integrity (2022-2023) at the University of Wollongong.

Robinson is a science facilitator for the Homeward Bound project, a leadership program for women in science, technology, engineering, and mathematics (STEM). She was a faculty member for the HB3 (2018-2019) and HB5 (2020-2021) programs, as well as the Island Sky voyage 2023.

== Early life and education ==
Robinson was born in London but lived in Cornwall from age 6 to 19. She attended Helston Community College in West Cornwall and Budehaven Community School on the North Coast of Cornwall. She moved back to London to study Genetics & Botany at University College London (UCL) and graduated in 1983. She then worked for two years in student politics, first at UCL as a sabbatical officer and president of the union (UCLU) concerned with student education and welfare, and then as an executive officer of the National Union of Students.

In 1986 she completed a Graduate Certificate in Science Education at King's College London and taught science at Hampstead School, London for a year. She then returned to UCL in 1987 to start a PhD with Professor George Stewart, "Nitrogen metabolism in carrot cell cultures" which she completed in 1990.

== Career and impact ==
After graduating, she held postdoctoral positions at Duke University in the US (1991) and the School of Biological Sciences, Australian National University, Canberra (1992-1995).

Robinson was made the inaugural lecturer in plant physiology at the University of Wollongong in 1996, and became a Senior Professor in 2016. She is a plant ecophysiologist and climate change biologist. Her research examines how plants respond to climate change with an integrated systems approach using molecular to ecological techniques. Throughout her career she has pioneered novel techniques to investigate metabolic processes in vivo and has expertise in plant nitrogen metabolism, respiration, photosynthesis and photoprotective mechanisms (both for visible and ultraviolet (UV) radiation). An early career highlights was demonstrating a role for the enzyme glutamate dehydrogenase in nitrogen mobilisation. Some of her most impactful work has been in developing on-line mass spectrometry methods to measure the pathways that contribute to plant respiration, which has enabled assessment of plant stress physiology and thermoregulation.

Robinson established the first long-term monitoring of Antarctic vegetation in 2000. Her findings since then have shown that change is occurring in these plant communities at an unprecedented rate, including species shifts in East Antarctic terrestrial communities and declining plant health due to climate change. The research is providing some of the first evidence that climate change and ozone depletion are affecting East Antarctic terrestrial communities.

Robinson has pioneered the use of isotope analysis and other chemical makers for understanding how Antarctic mosses function and how climate change is affecting Antarctic plants. Through her research using of radiocarbon bomb spike she has been able to date Antarctic mosses – providing long-term growth records that demonstrate these are “old growth mosses”.

In her research she uses unmanned aerial vehicles (UAVs) to measure canopy productivity using chlorophyll fluorescence and spectroscopic techniques. She has developed a near-remote sensing technologies to assess and track plant health in Antarctica and elsewhere.

Robinson is a member of the United Nations Environment Programme Environmental Effects Assessment Panel, served on the Australian Research Council College of Experts (2013-2017), and is an Editor for the journal Global Change Biology and Conservation Physiology. She has written several articles for the public, exhibited Antarctic photography, produced award-winning YouTube video to promote science and presented a TEDx talk. She has visited the Antarctic continent and islands more than 12 times and her research has been featured in the UOW 40 years of Research, UOW Women of Impact, and ABC and BBC Science sites. In 2012 she was an invited speaker at the Australian Academy of Science, Mawson Symposium at the Shine Dome in Canberra.

Robinson was the Executive Director of the UOW Global Challenges Program from 2020-2022, and Leader of the Program's Sustaining Coastal and Marine Zones Challenge from 2018-2020 at the University of Wollongong.

== Awards and honours ==
Robinson has been awarded several prizes over her career. Most recently, she was awarded the UOW Vice Chancellor's Researcher of the Year award for 2019 and in 2018 she was awarded the Vice Chancellor's Outstanding Achievement in Research Partnership and Impact award. At the start of her research career the Linnean Society of London awarded her the Irene Manton Prize, for the Best UK PhD in Botany, 1991.

She has also been awarded prizes for teaching. The Australian Society of Plant Scientists' awarded Robinson their Teaching Award in 2002. She has also been awarded prizes for her educational videos, including the Chlorotube 1st prize Competition 3 (YouTube In the Heat of the Night) 2010, 2nd prize Competition 1 (YouTube The Science of Cool) 2009.

In 2021 she was shortlisted for the Eureka Prize in the Leadership in Innovation and Science category.

Robinson was appointed a Member of the Order of Australia in the 2023 King's Birthday Honours for "significant service to science, particularly the study of Antarctic environmental change". She received an Australian Laureate Fellowship in 2024.

== Selected bibliography ==
- Lea, Peter J.; Robinson, Sharon A.; Stewart, George R. (1990). "The enzymology and metabolism of glutamine, glutamate, and asparagine". The Biochemistry of Plants. 16: 121–159.
- Robinson, S. A.; Slade, A. P.; Fox, G. G.; Phillips, R.; Ratcliffe, R. G.; Stewart, G. R. (1991). "The role of glutamate dehydrogenase in plant nitrogen metabolism". Plant Physiology. 95 (2): 509–516. doi:10.1104/pp.95.2.509. PMC 1077561. PMID 16668014.
- Ballaré, C. L.; Caldwell, M. M.; Flint, S. D.; Robinson, S. A.; Bornman, J. F. (2011). "Effects of solar ultraviolet radiation on terrestrial ecosystems. Patterns, mechanisms, and interactions with climate change". Photochemical & Photobiological Sciences. 10 (2): 226–241. Bibcode:2011PhPhS..10..226B. doi:10.1039/c0pp90035d. hdl:11336/73927. PMID 21253661.
- Russell, A. W.; Critchley, C.; Robinson, S. A.; Franklin, L. A.; Seaton, G. G.; Chow, W. S.; Osmond, C. B. (1995). "Photosystem II regulation and dynamics of the chloroplast D1 protein in Arabidopsis leaves during photosynthesis and photoinhibition". Plant Physiology. 107 (3): 943–952. doi:10.1104/pp.107.3.943. PMC 157211. PMID 12228414.
- Ribas-Carbo, Miquel; Berry, Joseph A.; Yakir, Dan; Giles, Larry; Robinson, Sharon A.; Lennon, Adrian M.; Siedow, James N. (1995). "Electron partitioning between the cytochrome and alternative pathways in plant mitochondria". Plant Physiology. 109 (3): 829–837. doi:10.1104/pp.109.3.829. PMC 161383. PMID 12228636.
- Robinson, Sharon A.; Stewart, George R.; Phillips, Richard (1992). "Regulation of glutamate dehydrogenase activity in relation to carbon limitation and protein catabolism in carrot cell suspension cultures". Plant Physiology. 98 (3): 1190–1195. doi:10.1104/pp.98.3.1190. PMC 1080326. PMID 16668745.
- Robinson, S. A.; Yakir, D.; Ribas-Carbo, M.; Giles, L.; Osmond, C. B.; Siedow, J. N.; Berry, J. A. (1992). "Measurements of the engagement of cyanide-resistant respiration in the Crassulacean acid metabolism plant Kalanchoe daigremontiana with the use of on-line oxygen isotope discrimination". Plant Physiology. 100 (3): 1087–1091. doi:10.1104/pp.100.3.1087. PMC 1075750. PMID 16653089.
