= Korean Chemical Society =

Non-profit in Seoul, South Korea

- Formation: July 7, 1946
- Type: Learned Society
- Headquarters: Seoul, Seong-buk gu
- Location: South Korea
- Official language: Korean
- President: Hyun-Joon Ha
- Staff: About 7000
- Website: www.kcsnet.or.kr

- Korean Chemical Society
- Hangul: 대한화학회
- Hanja: 大韓化學會
- RR: Daehan hwahakhoe
- MR: Taehan hwahakhoe

Korean Chemical Society was founded on July 7, 1946. It is a non-profit corporation that aims a contribution toward a chemical scholarship, technological development, education, education, and the spread of chemical knowledge. There are about 7,000 members active around university, laboratories, industry, and schools, and there are about 140 organization and about 30 special member companies participating in KCS.

== Introduction ==
KCS has steering committee, including 12 branches, 12 departments, 3 editing committee, and board of trustees. KCS publishes journals including “The Journal of Korean Chemical Society”, “Bulletin of Korean Chemical Society” (english, monthly, SCI since 1981), “Chemistry: An Asian Journal”, “Physical Chemistry Chemical Physics”, and “ChemWorld”, the newsletter of KCS. Korean Chemical Society continuously works with other international chemical societies. KCS is also a member organization of IUPAC and FACS.

== Bulletin of Korean Chemical Society ==
Bulletin of Korean Chemical Society is a flagship journal of KCS representing basic and applied chemical science. It appeals to broad international readership in the chemical community. As an official journal of KCS, it reaches out to the chemical community worldwide. It is strictly peer-reviewed and welcomes papers written in English. The Bull. Korean Chem. Soc. Is jointly published with Wiley-VCH. It is read by chemist of all disciplines. This journal is on a SCI index. It means that this journal is globally recognized,

== Events ==
KCS holds annual meetings and several conferences. KCS also hosts KChO, the Korean Chemistry Olympiad. KChO is a well-known chemistry competition in Korea. KChO is also a team selection test of Korean team in IChO. KChO is composed of two summer schools and two winter schools. Every high school students (starting at 16 yr) can participate in school entering exam. After entering seasonal schools, students get lesson from professors and takes exam. Also, there are experimental test in seasonal schools. For further information, visit Korean Chemistry Olympiad. This is a part of Chemical Education and Outreach Program. Also, compiling chemical terms and nomenclature of chemical compounds in Korean is another part of this program, which KCS do as a national affiliated organization of the IUPAC.

Furthermore, in Science day of Korea, April 21, which was designated in 1967 by government, KCS holds “Contest for Chemical Poetry and Painting” for secondary school students, and “Contest for Chemical Poster” for elementary school and secondary school students. Award-winning works can be searched from http://new.kcsnet.or.kr/contest_poem_result.

KCS established “Carbon Culture Award” in 2012 to recognize and understand the importance of the Carbon.

== Awards ==
Awards
Name	Term
KCS Merit Award	Triennial
Academic Excellence Prize	Annual
Award for Excellent Research Paper	Annual
Award for the Advancement of Science	Annual
Award for the Advancement of Industry	Annual
Award for the Advancement of Education	Annual
Award for Chemical Education	Biennial
Award for Excellent Chemistry Teachers	Annual
Award for Doctoral Dissertation	Annual
Excellent Poster Presentation Prize	Biannual
Award for CEO in Chemistry	Annual
