= Korean Physics Olympiad =

The Korea Physics Olympiad (KPhO) is a physics competition held by the Korean Physical Society for middle and high school students.

== History ==
In 2010, KPhO changed to the form of General Physics Communication Education I and II, selecting the candidates for winter school by disguising it as providing AP courses. As of 2018, there exists a general physical course that includes calculus and one that does not. The first one is usually for science students; 55 are selected for winter school. The second is for students not in a science high school; 25 students are selected for this program.

== Business Background ==
In order to perform well in the International Physics Olympiad, the Korean Physical Society holds the Korean Physical Olympiad, and through the operation of the winter school, KPS discovers gifted students and educates them to contribute to the development of mathematics, science, and engineering in South Korea. Also, the Physics Olympiad Committee was established under the Korean Physical Society to select Korean students to be dispatched to the International Physics Olympiad competition every year, to supervise their education, and to participate in the international competition. The Physics Olympiad is supported by the Korea Science and Technology Foundation.

== Process ==
General Physics Communication Training Apply & Selection > General Physics 1 Communication Training > General Physics 2 Communication Training > Winter School Apply & Selection > Winter School > National Representatives Selection >National Representatives Training > International Physics Olympiad
