= Beat Keller =

Swiss molecular biologist (born 1958)

- Born: 14 September 1958 (age 68); Interlaken, Switzerland
- Known for: disease resistance in cereals, wheat genome sequencing
- Scientific career
- Fields: molecular biology, botany, wheat
- Workplaces: University of Zurich

Beat Keller (born 14 September 1958) is a Swiss molecular biologist and professor emeritus of plant molecular biology at the University of Zurich. He is known for his research on the molecular basis of disease resistance in cereals, including the isolation of the durable wheat resistance gene Lr34, and for his role in the International Wheat Genome Sequencing Consortium, which produced a fully annotated reference genome of bread wheat. He is a member of the German National Academy of Sciences Leopoldina and a foreign fellow of the National Academy of Agricultural Sciences of India, and was elected a member of the European Molecular Biology Organization (EMBO) in 2022.

== Early life and education ==
Keller was born in Interlaken, Switzerland. He studied biology at the University of Basel from 1978 to 1982 and received his doctorate there in 1985. During his doctoral studies he published research on the assembly of the head of bacteriophage T4, including the identification of gene 68, which encodes a prohead core protein involved in determining the size of the phage head.

== Career ==
In 1986 he continued his training as a molecular biologist with an EMBO Long-Term Fellowship at the Salk Institute for Biological Studies in San Diego, where he worked in the plant biology research group of Christopher John Lamb until 1989, studying glycine-rich and hydroxyproline-rich structural proteins of the plant cell wall.

In 1989 Keller returned to Switzerland and became leader of a plant biotechnology group at the Swiss Federal Research Station for Agronomy (today Agroscope), a position he held until 1997. In 1995 he completed his habilitation at ETH Zurich, where he lectured until 1997, and in 1997 he accepted an appointment as full professor of plant molecular biology and molecular phytopathology at the University of Zurich.

From 1998 to 2014 he was director of the university's Department of Plant and Microbial Biology. He became professor emeritus after his retirement in 2025.

=== Academic service ===
Keller was vice president of the Swiss Academy of Sciences (SCNAT) from 2001 to 2006. He initiated the University of Zurich's University Research Priority Program "Evolution in Action: From Genomes to Ecosystems", which ran for twelve years until 2024, and served as one of its co-directors. From 2014 to 2022 he was a member of the Research Council of the Swiss National Science Foundation, responsible for plant sciences.

Keller was a member of the executive committee of the International Wheat Genome Sequencing Consortium (IWGSC) from 2006 to 2018 and stepped down from its board of directors in 2018. He has also served as an editor of the journal Theoretical and Applied Genetics.

== Research ==
Keller's research focuses on the molecular basis of disease resistance in the cereals wheat, maize, barley and rye, in particular on genes that encode immune receptors recognising fungal pathogens, and on the evolution of the pathogens themselves. From 2010 to 2015 this work was supported by an Advanced Grant from the European Research Council.

=== Resistance genes in wheat, rye and maize ===
His group was among the first to isolate fungal disease resistance genes from the large, polyploid genome of bread wheat, cloning the leaf rust resistance gene Lr10 by map-based cloning in 2003 and the powdery mildew resistance gene Pm3b in 2004. By screening wheat gene bank collections, the group later identified previously undescribed functional alleles of Pm3. It also isolated the powdery mildew resistance gene Pm8, which was introduced into wheat from rye, and showed that it is the rye counterpart (orthologue) of the wheat Pm3 gene.

In maize, the group showed that Htn1, a gene conferring quantitative resistance to northern corn leaf blight, encodes a wall-associated receptor-like kinase. In 2021 it identified further wheat resistance genes, including Pm4 against powdery mildew, which functions through alternatively spliced transcripts encoding chimeric proteins, and Lr14a against leaf rust, which encodes a membrane-bound ankyrin-repeat protein. Keller also contributed to a population genomic study of Aegilops tauschii, the wild progenitor of the D subgenome of bread wheat, which identified candidate genes for disease and pest resistance.

=== The durable resistance gene Lr34 ===
Keller's group, with collaborators, isolated Lr34, a gene that provides durable resistance against leaf rust, stripe rust and powdery mildew, has remained effective for more than 50 years, and is present in wheat cultivars around the world. The gene encodes a protein resembling ATP-binding cassette (ABC) transporters. Later work showed that Lr34 remains functional when transferred as a transgene into other major cereals, including barley, rice, maize and sorghum, and identified the plant hormone abscisic acid as a substrate of the LR34 transporter.

=== Field trials with genetically modified wheat and barley ===
Resistance genes isolated by the group were also tested in field trials of genetically modified wheat and barley. In wheat, combining (pyramiding) transgenic immune receptors from different wheat gene pools improved powdery mildew resistance in the field over three seasons. In barley, transgenic lines with high expression of the wheat gene Lr34 showed complete resistance against barley leaf rust and powdery mildew in the field.

=== Evolution of the powdery mildew pathogen ===
In complementary research directions, Keller and colleagues have studied how the powdery mildew pathogen adapts to its hosts. They identified avirulence genes of the fungus that are recognised by the wheat Pm3 immune receptors, and showed that hybridisation between the wheat and rye forms of the pathogen gave rise to a new form able to infect triticale. Further studies showed how variation in the mildew genes AvrPm17 and AvrPm8 allowed the pathogen to overcome the rye-derived resistance genes Pm17 and Pm8 used in wheat breeding.

Recent work from his group has further clarified how wheat immune receptors recognise mildew effectors and how the pathogen escapes them. The group showed that the broad-spectrum resistance protein Pm3e recognises two structurally unrelated mildew effectors, and that its recognition range can be extended by engineering Pm3 immune receptors. It identified AvrPm4, the mildew effector recognised by the wheat kinase fusion protein Pm4, and found that the fungus can overcome Pm4 resistance without altering AvrPm4, through a second effector, SvrPm4, that suppresses its recognition while itself being recognised by another wheat resistance protein. The group also identified AvrWTK4, the RNase-like effector recognised by the wheat tandem kinase protein WTK4, whose integrated HMA-like domain appears to act as a direct effector-binding decoy.

=== Wheat genome sequencing ===
The work on the wheat genome within the framework of the International Wheat Genome Sequencing Consortium led to the production of the reference sequence IWGSC RefSeq v1.0, a fully annotated reference genome of the bread wheat cultivar Chinese Spring, published in Science in 2018. On his departure from its board, the consortium credited Keller's leadership as essential to achieving the reference sequence of bread wheat. He received the IWGSC Outstanding Leadership Award for 2016.

In 2023 Keller delivered the Biffen Lecture at the John Innes Centre, under the title "From the field, to the field: molecular characterization and breeding application of wheat resistance to fungal diseases".

== Honours and memberships ==
- 1986–1988: EMBO Long-Term Fellowship
- 2010–2015: Advanced Grant, European Research Council
- 2015: Member, German National Academy of Sciences Leopoldina (Section Agricultural and Nutritional Sciences)
- 2016: Outstanding Leadership Award, International Wheat Genome Sequencing Consortium
- 2022: Foreign Fellow, National Academy of Agricultural Sciences, India
- 2022: Elected member, European Molecular Biology Organization (EMBO)
- 2023: Biffen Lecture, John Innes Centre

== Selected publications ==
- Feuillet C, Travella S, Stein N, Albar L, Nublat A, Keller B (2003). "Map-based isolation of the leaf rust disease resistance gene Lr10 from the hexaploid wheat (Triticum aestivum L.) genome". Proceedings of the National Academy of Sciences of the United States of America. 100 (25): 15253–15258. doi:10.1073/pnas.2435133100
- Yahiaoui N, Srichumpa P, Dudler R, Keller B (2004). "Genome analysis at different ploidy levels allows cloning of the powdery mildew resistance gene Pm3b from hexaploid wheat". The Plant Journal. 37 (4): 528–538. doi:10.1046/j.1365-313X.2003.01977.x
- Krattinger SG, Lagudah ES, Spielmeyer W, Singh RP, Huerta-Espino J, McFadden H, Bossolini E, Selter LL, Keller B (2009). "A putative ABC transporter confers durable resistance to multiple fungal pathogens in wheat". Science. 323 (5919): 1360–1363. doi:10.1126/science.1166453
- Menardo F, Praz CR, Wyder S, Ben-David R, Bourras S, Matsumae H, McNally KE, Parlange F, Riba A, Roffler S, Schaefer LK, Shimizu KK, Valenti L, Zbinden H, Wicker T, Keller B (2016). "Hybridization of powdery mildew strains gives rise to pathogens on novel agricultural crop species". Nature Genetics. 48 (2): 201–205. doi:10.1038/ng.3485
- International Wheat Genome Sequencing Consortium (2018). "Shifting the limits in wheat research and breeding using a fully annotated reference genome". Science. 361 (6403): eaar7191. doi:10.1126/science.aar7191
- Sánchez-Martín J, Widrig V, Herren G, Wicker T, Zbinden H, Gronnier J, Spörri L, Praz CR, Heuberger M, Kolodziej MC, Isaksson J, Steuernagel B, Karafiátová M, Doležel J, Zipfel C, Keller B (2021). "Wheat Pm4 resistance to powdery mildew is controlled by alternative splice variants encoding chimeric proteins". Nature Plants. 7 (3): 327–341. doi:10.1038/s41477-021-00869-2
