= Philip Benfey =

American Plant Biologist

Philip N. Benfey
- Born: January 31, 1953; Bryn Mawr, Pennsylvania, USA
- Died: September 26, 2023 (aged 70); Durham, North Carolina, USA
- Education: Harvard University (Ph.D.); University of Paris VI (DEUG)
- Known for: Root Biology, Plant Development, Genomics, Single-Cell Technologies
- Awards: National Academy of Sciences, American Association for the Advancement of Science, Howard Hughes Medical Institute Investigator, ASPB Pioneer Award
- Scientific career
- Fields: Plant Biology, Genetics, Genomics
- Workplaces: Duke University, New York University, Rockefeller University

Philip N. Benfey (January 31, 1953 – September 26, 2023) was an American plant biologist renowned for his pioneering research in root biology, plant development, and genomics. He was a Distinguished Professor of Biology at Duke University making significant contributions to understanding the genetic and molecular basis of root growth and development. He was also known for his mentorship fostering the careers of numerous scientists worldwide.... His achievements inspired the dedication of a lifetime achievement award in his name after he died

== Early life and education ==
Philip Benfey was born in Bryn Mawr, Pennsylvania. He pursued early studies at the University of Paris VI, earning a DEUG diploma (Diplome d'Etudes Universitaire Generale). He later received his Ph.D. in cell and developmental biology from Harvard University under the guidance of Dr. Philip Leder, focusing on immunology. After recognizing the potential for transgenics in plants, he undertook postdoctoral research at Rockefeller University in the lab of Dr. Nam-Hai Chua, where he characterized the now widely-used cauliflower mosaic virus 35S promoter, advancing the study of gene regulation in plants.

== Career and research ==
In 1991, Benfey joined the Department of Biology at New York University (NYU), where he became a full professor in 2001. At NYU, he founded the Center for Comparative Functional Genomics and conducted fundamental research in the molecular genetics of root development. His early work focused on understanding asymmetric cell divisions in roots and led to the identification of key regulatory genes, such as SHORT-ROOT and SCARECROW, which are crucial for radial patterning in the model plant Arabidopsis thaliana.

In 2002, Benfey moved to Duke University, where he was named the Paul Kramer Distinguished Professor of Biology and served as the department chair. He played a key role in establishing the Duke Center for Systems Biology and was its director from 2007 to 2013. His leadership emphasized interdisciplinary research, combining biology with mathematics, physics, and computational approaches to advance the study of plant systems biology.

Benfey’s lab made significant advances in root biology, particularly through the development of innovative imaging techniques and the application of tissue specific and single-cell RNA sequencing to create detailed maps of gene expression in plant roots. His team’s research revealed insights into how plants respond to environmental stressors and manage growth through coordinated gene expression networks

Among innovations proposed by Benfey's lab are the following:

- Mobile transcription factors: Benfey’s research established the concept of mobile transcription factors that can specify asymmetric cell divisions in plant roots, leading to the discovery of key regulatory genes like SHORT-ROOT and SCARECROW.
- Technologies to study root growth and their underlying genetic and transcriptional programs : Benfey developed the RootArray, a microfluidic device allowing for the cultivation of multiple seedlings and detailed observation of root responses to environmental cues. This technology advanced the study of root system dynamics and paved the way for the founding of GrassRoots Biotechnology, which was later acquired by Monsanto. He also developed several imaging technologies to study roots
- Single-cell genomics: His lab was among the first to apply tissue-resolved and single-cell RNA sequencing to plant roots, revealing previously unknown aspects of root cell differentiation and gene expression.

== Professional recognition and leadership ==
Philip Benfey was an Investigator of the Howard Hughes Medical Institute (HHMI) from 2011 to 2023. He was elected to the United States National Academy of Sciences in 2010 and became a Fellow of the American Association for the Advancement of Science in 2004. In 2021, he was awarded the Pioneer Award from the American Society of Plant Biologists for his contributions to plant biology

Benfey served on numerous editorial boards, including Science, PNAS, and Developmental Cell. He co-founded and chaired the Scientific Advisory Board at Hi Fidelity Genetics Inc., a company focused on improving crop performance through advanced breeding technologies.
