= Daniel Daneshvar =

American board-certified physiatrist

Dan Daneshvar
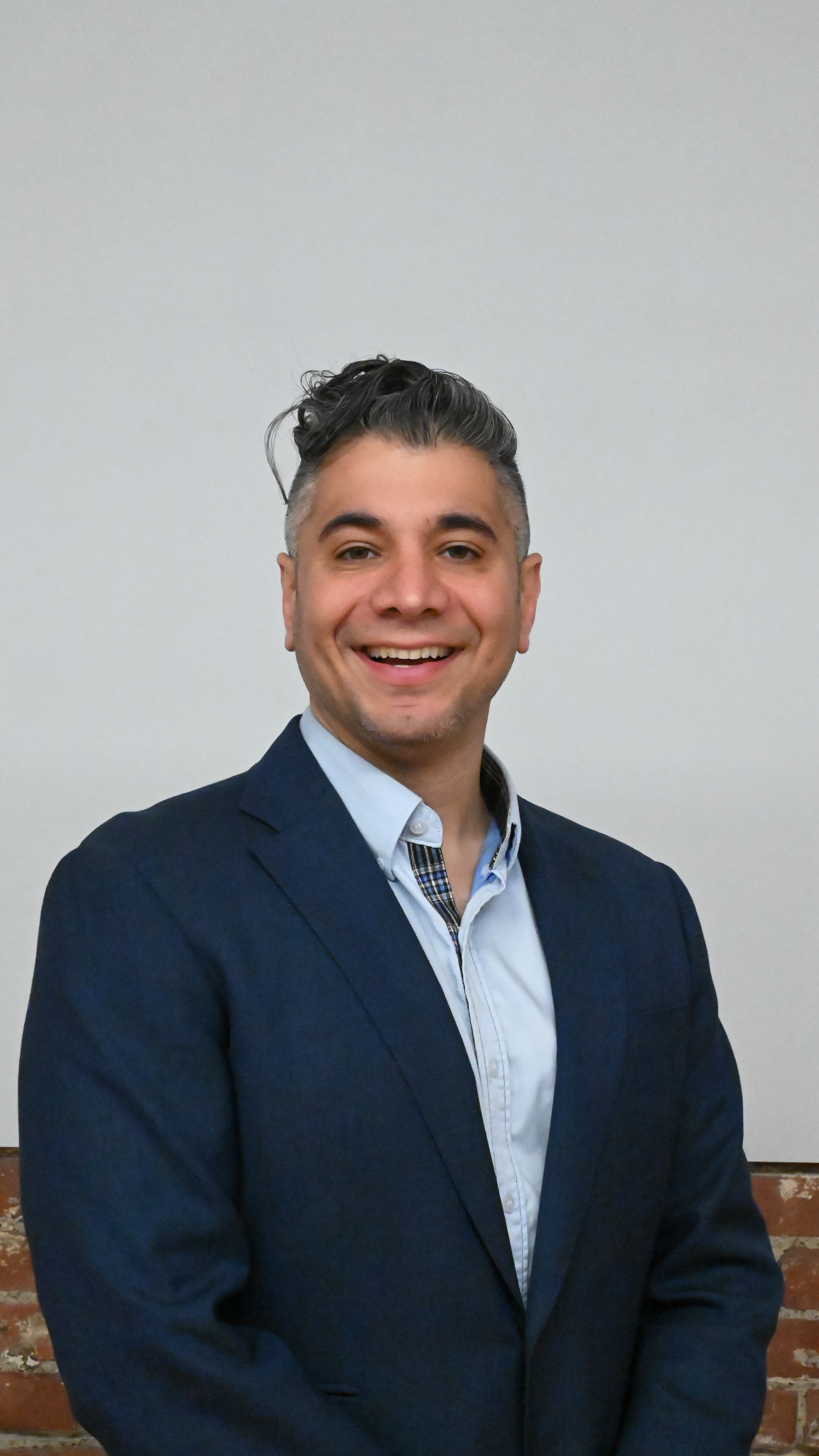
- Dan Daneshvar
- Born: 1983 (age 42–43)
- Education: Massachusetts Institute of Technology (SB); Boston University School of Medicine (MD, PhD)
- Known for: Study of traumatic brain injury Study of chronic traumatic encephalopathy Study of HealthSpan
- Scientific career
- Fields: Physiatry
- Workplaces: Harvard Medical School; Mass General Brigham; Spaulding Rehabilitation Hospital
- Doctoral advisor: Ann McKee

Dan H. Daneshvar (born March 2, 1983) is an American neuroscientist, brain injury physician, and physiatrist. He is known for his academic work in HealthSpan, traumatic brain injury, and the long-term consequences of repetitive head impacts, including chronic traumatic encephalopathy (CTE) and amyotrophic lateral sclerosis. He also founded Team Up Against Concussions, the first scientifically validated concussion education program for children. He is the Director of the Institute for Brain Research and Innovation at TeachAids, which created CrashCourse, a virtual-reality or video based concussion education program.

== Early life and education ==
Daneshvar grew up in Detroit, Michigan and attended Detroit Country Day School. He received his S.B. in Brain and Cognitive Sciences from MIT. He received his M.D. and Ph.D. dual degrees from Boston University School of Medicine. His work at the Boston University CTE Center and Brain Bank resulted in the first dissertation in history to study CTE. He completed his physical medicine and rehabilitation residency at the Stanford University School of Medicine.

== Career ==
Daneshvar is Chair of the Departments of Physical Medicine and Rehabilitation (PM&R) at Mass General Brigham, Spaulding Rehabilitation Hospital, and Harvard Medical School, Co-Director of Sports Concussion at Mass General Brigham, and Chief of Brain Health at Home Base, in Boston, Massachusetts. As Director of the HealthSpan Lab, he studies the biological, behavioral, and environmental factors that influence healthy aging and long-term function. In addition, his research focuses on identifying and characterizing the relationship between exposure to repetitive head impacts, and its effect on the development of early aging and neurodegenerative disease, including CTE and ALS. Daneshvar's work has been published in high impact journals including the Journal of the American Medical Association, Nature Communications, and The BMJ, and has received coverage from news organizations. As Director of the TeachAids Institute for Brain Research and Innovation, he also focuses on improving concussion education by using novel technology to attempt to change the culture around concussion reporting.

== Awards ==
- In 2016, Daneshvar received the Excellence in Public Health Award from the United States Public Health Service
- In 2021, Daneshvar received the Dean's Community Service Award from Harvard Medical School
- In 2024, Daneshvar received the Rising Star Award from the National Neurotrauma Society
- In 2025, Daneshvar received Innovator and Influencer honors from the American Academy of Physical Medicine and Rehabilitation
- In 2026, Daneshvar received the Innovation and Impact in Education Award from the Association of Academic Physiatrists
