= Mohammad Karamudini =

- Born: 1955; Sirjan, Iran
- Occupations: science journalist, science writer
- Known for: National Biology Textbooks, Biology (2012)
- Awards: award for the best science book of the year ( 2007, 2010 & 2012); Roshd award for the best instructional book ( 2003 & 2012)

Dr. Mohammad Karamudini (born 1955) is a prominent Iranian writer, translator, science journalist, and lecturer. He has authored and translated numerous articles and books in Persian, focusing on biology and biology education. With a portfolio of over 48 science and educational books, alongside many more articles published in Persian journals, he has made significant contributions to science communication in Iran.
Dr. Karamudini has received numerous accolades, including the prestigious "Best Book of the Year" award (four times: 2006, 2010, 2011, and 2017), the "Roshd Festival Award for Best Educational Books" (three times: 2002, 2011, and 2013), and the "Festival Award for Best University Textbooks" (2012). As a pioneer in biology education in Iran, he co-founded the Iranian Biology Olympiad and served as the head of its national scientific committee for 20 years, shaping the future of biology education and inspiring countless students.

== Career ==
Mohammad Karamudini began his career in science education in 1974 as a biology teacher in Iranian national and international high schools. Over the years, his exceptional teaching performance earned him numerous accolades, including:

- Distinguished Teaching Award from the Ministry of Education (1991)
- Recognition as an Outstanding Educator and Researcher by the Curriculum Development Center (2001)
- Award for Most Outstanding Researcher from the Organization for Educational Research and Planning (2002)

Before retiring in July 2006, he served for 10 years as the Head of the Biology Department at the Organization for Educational Research and Planning in Iran, where he played a pivotal role in shaping national biology curricula and advancing science education.

== Books and publications ==
Mohammad Karamudini has over 30 publications in the Persian. He has several papers in English, including:

- "Developing Biology Education in Developing Countries" presented in BioEd2000 in Paris, (2000)
- "Project-Based Learning in Science Education" presented in the 3ed International Conference on Science and Technology Education in East London, South Africa, (2003)

His book, the "Photosynthesis", brought to him the honor of being elected as the best author of educational publications for secondary students in 2003.

== Some books in Persian ==
- "A Collection of Articles", Rahaveard, 1992;
- "Plant Biology, A Student Guide and Workbook", Fatemi Publisher, 2000;
- "Photosynthesis", Mehranb-e Ghalam, 2002;
- "Sokhan: Great encyclopedia of Persian Words", An 8 Volume Book, Elmi Publisher, (Group Work), 2002;
- "Biology", Madreseh Publisher, (Translated), 2003;
- "Animal Show", Ofogh, A 6 volume Book, (Translated), 2005;
- "Plants", Entesharat-e Fanni-e Iran, (Translated), 2005;
- "Ecology", Fatemi Publisher, (Translated), 2009;
- "Biological Sciences, A Textbook for 9th Graders", Chap Va Nashr Publication Co., (Group Work);
- "Biology and Lab(1), A textbook for 10th gradres", Chap Va Nashr Publication Co., (Group Work);
- "Biology and Lab(2), A textbook for 11th graders", Chap Va Nashr Publication Co., (Group Work);
- "Biology, A textbook for Preuniversity Students", Chap Va Nashr Publication Co., (Group Work);
- "Biological Sciences, A teachers book for Grade 9th", Chap Va Nashr Publication Co., (Group Work);
- "Biology and Lab, A Teachers Book for Grade 10th", Chap Va Nashr Publication Co., (Group Work);
- "Biology and Lab, A teachers Book for Grade 11th", Chap Va Nashr Publication Co., (Group Work);
- "Ecology and Animal Behavior", Fatemi Publisher,
- "Biology", Fatemi Publisher,
- "Encyclopedia of Science for Children", Ofogh Publisher, (Group Work), (Translated), Coming Soon;
- "Ethology", Fatemi Publisher;
- "Living as Butterlflies Do: A Collection of Articles", Khane-ye Zist Shensi, 2012
