= International Biology Olympiad =

Biological olympiad for pre-university students

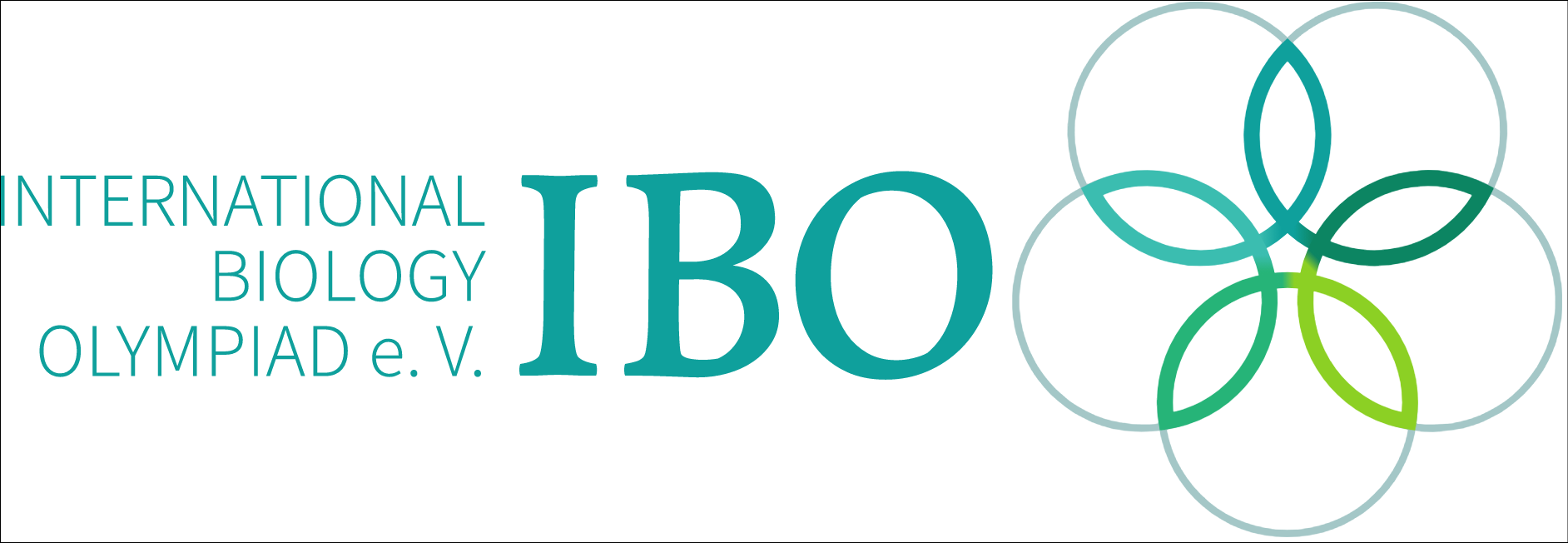
Logo of the International Biology Olympiad

The International Biology Olympiad (IBO) is a biological olympiad for pre-university students under the age 20, and is one of the most well-known International Science Olympiads. The first IBO was held in Czechoslovakia in 1990, and it has since been held annually. The competition has gradually expanded to include more than 75 participating countries across five continents. All participating countries send the four winners of their National Biology Olympiad to the IBO, usually accompanied by two adults who are members of the international jury, for the duration of the competition. On 2 June 2026 have 80 Full members and 2 Pending members (Nepal,Kuwait) and 1 observer (Nigeria).

To select these top four life science contestants for this international competition, all member countries host Biology Olympiad competitions in typically 3-5 consecutively more difficult national competition rounds. As a consequence, this leads to a trickle-down effect, engaging more than 1 million students worldwide in life science each year.

In 2020 and 2021, during the COVID-19 pandemic, the editions hosted by Japan and Portugal were organized virtually with the Japan edition including a unique international group-based scientific project International Group Project 2020.

== IBO 2020 and the International Group Project ==
In the face of the threat of the International Science Olympiads' cancellation due to the COVID-19 pandemic (the International Physics Olympiad was officially canceled), the IBO 2020 was the first in the International Science Olympiads that was claimed by the host (Japan) to be held entirely virtually with a guaranteed supervision to adapt to the pandemic.

Notably, in the IBO 2020, the International Group Project was proposed. This is the first international group-based scientific project in the history of International Science Olympiads, aiming to intensify scientific discussion and collaboration among competitors from various countries.

In the International Group Project 2020, there are 50 research teams, and every team consists of 4 to 7 competitors, all representing different countries. In each team, these young biologists collaborated with their international fellows in a three-month scientific project. Finally, they had to propose a professional poster or presentation about an outstanding, innovative idea that can determine biology's future and solve a critical global issue. Every performance was evaluated by noble professors of Japan in life science.

Altogether, 53 countries and 202 contestants participated in the International Group Project 2020. This project was described as "the first trial of a collaborative research opportunity in IBO's history." Among 50 teams, six outstanding teams had (25 students) received the Award of Excellence for the best performance.

== Summary ==
Each year, the IBO is organised by a different country.

No.	Year	City	Country	Date	Participating countries
1	1990	Olomouc	Czechoslovakia	July 1–7	6
2	1991	Makhachkala	Soviet Union	July 1–7	9
3	1992	Poprad	Czechoslovakia	July 6–12	12
4	1993	Utrecht	Netherlands	July 4–11	15
5	1994	Varna	Bulgaria	July 3–10	18
6	1995	Bangkok	Thailand	July 2–9	22
7	1996	Artek	Ukraine	June 30–July 7	23
8	1997	Ashgabat	Turkmenistan	July 13–20	28
9	1998	Kiel	Germany	July 19–26	33
10	1999	Uppsala	Sweden	July 4–11	36
11	2000	Antalya	Turkey	July 9–16	38
12	2001	Brussels	Belgium	July 8–15	38
13	2002	Jurmala and Riga	Latvia	July 7–14	40
14	2003	Minsk	Belarus	July 8–16	41
15	2004	Brisbane	Australia	July 11–18	40
16	2005	Beijing	China	July 10–17	50
17	2006	Rio Cuarto	Argentina	July 9–16	48
18	2007	Saskatoon	Canada	July 15–22	49
19	2008	Mumbai	India	July 13–20	55
20	2009	Tsukuba	Japan	July 12–19	56
21	2010	Changwon	South Korea	July 11–18	58
22	2011	Taipei	Taiwan	July 10–17	58
23	2012	Singapore	Singapore	July 8–15	59
24	2013	Bern	Switzerland	July 14–21	62
25	2014	Bali	Indonesia	July 6–13	61
26	2015	Aarhus	Denmark	July 12–19	62
27	2016	Hanoi	Vietnam	July 17–24	68
28	2017	Coventry	United Kingdom	July 23–30	64
29	2018	Tehran	Iran	July 15–22	68
30	2019	Szeged	Hungary	July 14–21	72
31	2020	Nagasaki	Japan	Due to the COVID-19 pandemic, replaced by a remotely conducted competition, the IBO Challenge 2020, and a group-based scientific project, the International Group Project. The whole competition was operated from August 11–24.	47 in both competitions (+5 in only the International Group Project)
32	2021	Lisbon	Portugal	Due to the COVID-19 pandemic, replaced by a remotely conducted competition, the IBO Challenge II. The whole competition was operated from July 18–23.	72
33	2022	Yerevan	Armenia	July 10–18	62
34	2023	Al Ain	United Arab Emirates	July 3–11	76
35	2024	Astana	Kazakhstan	July 7–14	74
36	2025	Quezon City	Philippines	July 20–27	77
37	2026	Vilnius	Lithuania	July 12–19	78
38	2027	Warsaw	Poland		
39	2028		Netherlands		
40	2029		Czech Republic		

== Performance of countries ==
As of July 2026, the current list of countries with the best results (spanning the last 11 years) for gold medals are as follows:

Rank	Country	Gold in Last 11 contests (2016–2026)
1	China	37 (4+3+4+4+3+4+n/a+3+4+4+4)
2	Taiwan	36 (4+4+4+3+2+4+3+3+4+1+4)
3	Singapore	30 (4+3+3+3+1+1+2+4+2+4+3)
4	USA	27 (3+4+n/a+2+3+2+n/a+2+4+3+4)
5	Russia	22 (1+2+3+0+3+2+4+3+2+2+"n/a")
6	South Korea	20 (2+2+3+4+1+0+0+1+2+1+4)
7	Iran	17 (0+n/a+2+0+0+0+4+2+3+3+3)
8	Vietnam	11 (1+1+3+0+1+1+0+0+3+1+0)
9	India	10 (1+0+0+0+0+0+1+4+1+2+1)
9	Turkey	10 (n/a+0+1+2+0+1+2+0+1+2+1)
11	Germany	9 (2+1+1+0+1+0+1+2+0+1+0)
11	Hungary	9 (2+1+0+4+0+0+1+0+0+0+1)
13	Thailand	8 (1+0+0+1+1+1+2+0+1+1+0)
14	Indonesia	7 (1+1+0+1+0+1+2+0+0+0+1)
15	Bulgaria	6 (0+1+0+0+0+2+1+1+1+0+0)
15	Japan	6 (1+0+0+0+1+0+1+2+0+0+1)
17	United Kingdom	5 (0+1+3+0+0+0+0+1+0+0+0)
17	Netherlands	5 (0+0+0+3+1+0+0+0+0+0+1)
17	Czech Republic	5 (0+1+0+0+1+1+1+0+0+0+1)
20	Australia	4 (0+0+0+0+0+1+n/a+1+1+1+0)
20	Poland	4 (0+0+1+0+0+1+1+0+0+1+0)
22	Israel	3 (n/a+n/a+n/a+n/a+n/a+n/a+0+0+0+1+2)
22	Hong Kong	3 (n/a+n/a+n/a+1+0+0+n/a+0+2+0+0)
22	Azerbaijan	3 (0+0+0+0+1+2+n/a+0+0+0+0)
22	Qatar	3 (n/a+n/a+0+0+n/a+3+0+0+0+0+0)
22	Uzbekistan	3 (0+0+0+0+1+2+0+0+n/a+n/a+"n/a") (Note: Uzbekistan was disqualified in 2024, and has not participated since)
27	New Zealand	1 (0+1+n/a+0+n/a+0+0+0+0+0+0)
27	Italy	1 (0+0+0+1+n/a+0+0+0+0+0+0)
27	Lithuania	1 (0+0+0+1+0+0+0+0+0+0+0)
27	Slovenia	1 (0+0+0+1+0+0+0+0+0+0+0)
27	Switzerland	1 (0+0+1+0+0+0+0+0+0+0+0)
27	Pakistan	1 (0+0+0+0+0+0+0+0+0+1+0)
27	Armenia	1 (0+0+0+0+0+0+0+0+0+1+0)
27	Malaysia	1 (0+0+n/a+n/a+n/a+n/a+n/a+n/a+n/a+0+1)

=== All ===
https://www.ibo-info.org/en/list-of-countries-regions.html

Since 1990 to 2025:

In almost every edition, the top 10% of participants receive gold, the next 20% receive silver, and the next 30% receive bronze.

International Biology Olympiad medal table
Rank	Nation	Gold	Silver	Bronze	Total
1	Myanmar (MMR)	0	0	4	4
2	Albania (ALB)	0	0	0	0
2	Algeria (DZA)	0	0	0	0
2	Argentina (ARG)	0	0	0	0
2	Armenia (ARM)	0	0	0	0
2	Australia (AUS)	0	0	0	0
2	Austria (AUT)	0	0	0	0
2	Azerbaijan (AZE)	0	0	0	0
2	Bangladesh (BGD)	0	0	0	0
2	Belarus (BLR)	0	0	0	0
2	Belgium (BEL)	0	0	0	0
2	Bolivia (BOL)	0	0	0	0
2	Bosnia and Herzegovina (BIH)	0	0	0	0
2	Brazil (BRA)	0	0	0	0
2	Bulgaria (BGR)	0	0	0	0
2	Canada (CAN)	0	0	0	0
2	Chile (CHL)	0	0	0	0
2	China (CHN)	0	0	0	0
2	Colombia (COL)	0	0	0	0
2	Costa Rica (CRI)	0	0	0	0
2	Croatia (HRV)	0	0	0	0
2	Cuba (CUB)	0	0	0	0
2	Cyprus (CYP)	0	0	0	0
2	Czech Republic (CZE)	0	0	0	0
2	Denmark (DNK)	0	0	0	0
2	Dominican Republic (DOM)	0	0	0	0
2	Ecuador (ECU)	0	0	0	0
2	Egypt (EGY)	0	0	0	0
2	El Salvador (SLV)	0	0	0	0
2	Estonia (EST)	0	0	0	0
2	Finland (FIN)	0	0	0	0
2	France (FRA)	0	0	0	0
2	Gabon (GAB)	0	0	0	0
2	Georgia (GEO)	0	0	0	0
2	Germany (DEU)	0	0	0	0
2	Ghana (GHA)	0	0	0	0
2	Great Britain (GBR)	0	0	0	0
2	Greece (GRC)	0	0	0	0
2	Honduras (HND)	0	0	0	0
2	Hong Kong (HKG)	0	0	0	0
2	Hungary (HUN)	0	0	0	0
2	India (IND)	0	0	0	0
2	Iran (IRN)	0	0	0	0
2	Iraq (IRQ)	0	0	0	0
2	Ireland (IRL)	0	0	0	0
2	Israel (ISR)	0	0	0	0
2	Italy (ITA)	0	0	0	0
2	Jamaica (JAM)	0	0	0	0
2	Japan (JPN)	0	0	0	0
2	Jordan (JOR)	0	0	0	0
2	Kazakhstan (KAZ)	0	0	0	0
2	Kenya (KEN)	0	0	0	0
2	Kuwait (KWT)	0	0	0	0
2	Kyrgyzstan (KGZ)	0	0	0	0
2	Laos (LAO)	0	0	0	0
2	Latvia (LVA)	0	0	0	0
2	Lebanon (LBN)	0	0	0	0
2	Lesotho (LSO)	0	0	0	0
2	Liberia (LBR)	0	0	0	0
2	Lithuania (LTU)	0	0	0	0
2	Luxembourg (LUX)	0	0	0	0
2	Madagascar (MDG)	0	0	0	0
2	Malawi (MWI)	0	0	0	0
2	Malaysia (MYS)	0	0	0	0
2	Mali (MLI)	0	0	0	0
2	Malta (MLT)	0	0	0	0
2	Mauritania (MRT)	0	0	0	0
2	Mauritius (MUS)	0	0	0	0
2	Mexico (MEX)	0	0	0	0
2	Moldova (MDA)	0	0	0	0
2	Mongolia (MNG)	0	0	0	0
2	Montenegro (MNE)	0	0	0	0
2	Morocco (MAR)	0	0	0	0
2	Mozambique (MOZ)	0	0	0	0
2	Namibia (NAM)	0	0	0	0
2	Nepal (NEP)	0	0	0	0
2	Netherlands (NLD)	0	0	0	0
2	New Zealand (NZL)	0	0	0	0
2	Nicaragua (NIC)	0	0	0	0
2	Niger (NER)	0	0	0	0
2	Nigeria (NGA)	0	0	0	0
2	North Korea (PRK)	0	0	0	0
2	North Macedonia (MKD)	0	0	0	0
2	Norway (NOR)	0	0	0	0
2	Oman (OMN)	0	0	0	0
2	Pakistan (PAK)	0	0	0	0
2	Palestine (PSE)	0	0	0	0
2	Panama (PAN)	0	0	0	0
2	Papua New Guinea (PNG)	0	0	0	0
2	Paraguay (PAR)	0	0	0	0
2	Peru (PER)	0	0	0	0
2	Philippines (PHL)	0	0	0	0
2	Poland (POL)	0	0	0	0
2	Portugal (PRT)	0	0	0	0
2	Romania (ROU)	0	0	0	0
2	Russia (RUS)	0	0	0	0
2	Rwanda (RWA)	0	0	0	0
2	Saudi Arabia (SAU)	0	0	0	0
2	Senegal (SEN)	0	0	0	0
2	Serbia (SRB)	0	0	0	0
2	Sierra Leone (SLE)	0	0	0	0
2	Singapore (SGP)	0	0	0	0
2	Slovakia (SVK)	0	0	0	0
2	Slovenia (SVN)	0	0	0	0
2	Somalia (SOM)	0	0	0	0
2	South Africa (ZAF)	0	0	0	0
2	South Korea (KOR)	0	0	0	0
2	Spain (ESP)	0	0	0	0
2	Sri Lanka (LKA)	0	0	0	0
2	Sudan (SDN)	0	0	0	0
2	Sweden (SWE)	0	0	0	0
2	Switzerland (CHE)	0	0	0	0
2	Syria (SYR)	0	0	0	0
2	Taiwan (TWN)	0	0	0	0
2	Tajikistan (TJK)	0	0	0	0
2	Tanzania (TZA)	0	0	0	0
2	Thailand (THA)	0	0	0	0
2	Togo (TGO)	0	0	0	0
2	Trinidad and Tobago (TTO)	0	0	0	0
2	Tunisia (TUN)	0	0	0	0
2	Turkey (TUR)	0	0	0	0
2	Turkmenistan (TKM)	0	0	0	0
2	Uganda (UGA)	0	0	0	0
2	Ukraine (UKR)	0	0	0	0
2	United Arab Emirates (ARE)	0	0	0	0
2	United States (USA)	0	0	0	0
2	Uruguay (URY)	0	0	0	0
2	Uzbekistan (UZB)	0	0	0	0
2	Venezuela (VEN)	0	0	0	0
2	Vietnam (VNM)	0	0	0	0
2	Yemen (YEM)	0	0	0	0
2	Zambia (ZMB)	0	0	0	0
2	Zimbabwe (ZWE)	0	0	0	0
Totals (133 entries)		0	0	4	4

== See also ==
- List of biology awards
- International Mathematical Olympiad
- International Chemistry Olympiad
