= Molecular Biology of the Cell =

- Discipline: Cell biology, genetics, developmental biology
- Language: English
- Edited by: Matthew Welch

Publication details
- Former name(s): Cell Regulation
- History: 1989-present
- Publisher: American Society for Cell Biology (United States)
- Frequency: Biweekly
- Open access: Delayed, after 2 months
- Impact factor: 3.512 (2017)

Standard abbreviations
- ISO 4: Mol. Biol. Cell

Indexing
- CODEN: MBCEEV
- ISSN: 1059-1524 (print); 1939-4586 (web)
- LCCN: 92660504
- OCLC no.: 39378688

Links
- Journal homepage; Online access; Online archive

Molecular Biology of the Cell is a biweekly peer-reviewed scientific journal published by the American Society for Cell Biology. It covers research on the molecular basis of cell structure and function. According to the Journal Citation Reports, the journal has a 2012 impact factor of 4.803. It was originally established as Cell Regulation in 1989.

The Editor-in-Chief is John D. Aitchison (Seattle Children's Research Institute, University of Washington). Previous Editors-in-Chief include: Erkki Ruoslahti (of Cell Regulation), David Botstein and Keith Yamamoto (of MBoC), and their successors Sandra Schmid, David Drubin, and Matthew Welch (University of California, Berkeley).
