= Haldane Lecture =

- Sponsored by: John Innes Centre
- First award: 2001
- Website: www.jic.ac.uk/news-and-events/whats-on/friday-seminars/haldane-lecture/

The Haldane Lecture is an award lecture given at the John Innes Centre in the United Kingdom since 2001. The lecture is named in honour of J.B.S. Haldane, who was employed by the John Innes Trustees from 1927 to 1937 under the directorship of Alfred Daniel Hall.

== Haldane Lecturers ==
Source: John Innes Centre

- 2017 Eske Willerslev
- 2016 Michael Elowitz
- 2014 Michael Lynch
- 2011 Simon Levin
- 2007 Herbert Jäckle
- 2006 Bruce Stillman
- 2004 Pat Brown
- 2003 Sydney Brenner
- 2002 Tim Mitchison
- 2001 John Maynard Smith

All Haldane Lecturers are presented with a print of a work of art by Leonie Woolhouse, wife of Harold Woolhouse. During their visit to the John Innes Centre, Haldane Lecturers are given the opportunity to have their portrait painted by Enrico Coen as a memento.

== See also ==
- List of genetics awards
