= Watkins Landrace Wheat Collection =

Heritage wheat conservation effort (United Kingdom,1930s)

The A E Watkins Landrace Wheat Collection is a collection of heritage (landrace) varieties of wheat from around the world which are adapted to their local growing environment, the collection was collected in the 1930s and contains materials from 32 countries.

The genetic diversity of the wheat in the collection is greater than found in modern varieties, and so this historical collection is being explored as a source of genetic diversity for key traits, such as disease resistance. The collection is now stored within the Germplasm Resources Unit at the John Innes Centre in Norwich.

== Significance ==
The Watkins Landrace Wheat Collection is a unique resource due to the historical nature of being collected in the 1930’s before widespread globalisation of trade, and before intensive selective breeding in wheat to develop high-yielding elite varieties, which resulted in a significant loss of genetic diversity, including resilience traits.

The Watkins wheat collection is now being explored for potential genetic resistance to aphids and wheat bulb fly eyespot resistance tan spot, Stagonospora nodorum blotch (SNB) and Fusarium head blight. The collection is also being explored as a source of genetic diversity for traits like Starch Digestibility.

== Arthur Ernest Watkins ==
The collection is named after the botanist Arthur Ernest Watkins, who was the first scientist to determine the number of chromosomes in wheat, but also spearheaded the collection efforts and recognised the importance of having genetic material from all around the world.

Arthur Ernest Watkins (April 23rd 1898 - January 3rd 1967), was awarded a Diploma in Agriculture from the University of Cambridge in 1922. In 1924, he joined the Plant Breeding Institute, and in 1931 was appointed as a lecturer in Cytology at the University of Cambridge’s Faculty of Agriculture and was a member of the Genetical Society. A E Watkins worked alongside Dr Harold Howard, who would later lead a research group to develop the Maris Piper variety of potato, which was the first potato bred to be resistant to potato cyst nematodes.

Watkins also wrote multiple books and papers on a variety of topics, including The Origin of Cultivated Plants, Heredity and Evolution, and The Wheat Species; a Critique by A.E. Watkins.
