= Thomas Barlow Wood =

British chemist (1869-1929)

Thomas Barlow Wood (Note: Known as T. B. Wood) (21 January 1869 – 6 November 1929) was a British chemist and agricultural scientist who researched animal nutrition, published an influential paper on experimental error, and was one of researchers who isolated cannabinol. He was associated with the School of Agriculture at the University of Cambridge almost from its foundation; he held the Drapers' chair of agriculture (1907–29), and the school's prestige grew under his leadership. He also directed the Animal Nutrition Research Institute at Cambridge (from 1912), served as the first editor-in-chief of The Journal of Agricultural Science (1905–29) and was a fellow of Gonville and Caius College (1908–29). His textbooks include The Story of a Loaf of Bread (1913), Food Economy in Wartime (1915; with Frederick Gowland Hopkins), The Chemistry of Crop Production (1920) and Animal Nutrition (1924). He received the CBE, and was an elected fellow of the Royal Society and the Institute of Chemistry.

== Education and career ==
Thomas Barlow Wood was born on 21 January 1869 at Habberley in Shropshire. His father, E. D. or B. D. Wood, from Field Dalling near Holt in Norfolk, was a farmer, and his mother was from a family of potters from Staffordshire. He attended Newcastle High School, Staffordshire, and then read natural sciences at Gonville and Caius College, Cambridge, graduating in 1889 or 1891. He specialised in chemistry, studying under Henry John Horstman Fenton and Sell.

In the summer of 1891, Wood briefly studied agricultural chemistry with Henry Robinson (assistant to George Downing Liveing, the head of the chemistry department), in the earliest such course at the university. That year, finance became available for county councils to employ people from the universities of Cambridge and Oxford to give courses in agricultural science, and Wood joined this scheme. He initially worked as a lecturer in Devon (1891), and then in his home county of Norfolk (1892–93), where he additionally taught (agricultural) science at Norfolk County School and undertook field trials.

At the beginning of 1894, Wood became Liveing's assistant, and secretary of the School of Agriculture, University of Cambridge (which had been founded by Liveing and Thomas McKenny Hughes in 1892), becoming lecturer and, in 1902, reader in agricultural chemistry. With the other early staff members of the agriculture school, R. H. Biffen and Cecil Warburton, Wood devised lecture courses in agriculture; he divided his time between lecturing and demonstrating at the university, conducting chemical research in the laboratory, and teaching farmers across the region. Under his influence the department soon started to attract students interested in agricultural developments. By 1905 he was considered a "first class chemist devoted to agricultural topics".

From 1907 until his death, Wood held the Drapers' chair of agriculture at the School of Agriculture, which had been established in 1899. In this post, he managed the construction of the department's initial buildings, and during his 22-year tenure, is credited with growing the department, as well as enhancing its stature within the university, nationally and internationally. In 1908 he was elected the inaugural Monro fellow of Gonville and Caius College. In 1912, an Animal Nutrition Research Institute was established in Cambridge, which he led, initially with F. G. Hopkins but later alone.

Throughout much of his academic career, Wood was also a farmer at Holt in Norfolk, after inheriting his father's farm. This experience helped him in encouraging farmers to adopt new methods arising from agricultural research. During the First World War he served on several important committees relating to wartime food supply, including the Food Council, the Interallied Food Commission and the Royal Society Food Committee, and was involved in developing schemes to provide farm animals with adequate nutrition despite the reduced supply of animal foodstuffs. He also served on the Development Commission (1917–19), the body that planned research in agriculture and allocated government funding for it.

== Research, writing and editing ==
His early research (in the 1890s) was in chemistry, and included the isolation of cannabinol from Indian hemp, with W. T. Newton Spivey and Thomas Hill Easterfield in 1896.

Some of Wood's early work in agricultural chemistry was on root crops used as animal fodder, particularly mangolds, including the chemical composition of different varieties and how this is affected by storage. Out of these studies came a paper (with the astrophysicist F. J. M. Stratton) described in Wood's Royal Society obituary as "one of the earliest studies of the experimental error involved in field trials". V. H. Blackman later recalled this work: "here the biologist had acquired something entirely new, for he had been provided with a tool—hitherto wholly lacking—for testing the validity of the conclusions drawn from his experimental results." Wood also worked on analysing strength in wheat flour, proving that two different factors interact to determine the size of the loaf, the gluten elasticity, as well as the flour's ability to generate carbon dioxide bubbles during fermentation. Other early areas of agricultural research included animal breeding, especially the Mendelian inheritance of horns and facial colour in sheep.

Later (and particularly after the First World War), his research focused on animal nutrition, especially the question of how to make feeding farm stock "efficient and economic". This work built on basic research on proteins and vitamins by Emil Fischer and Gowland Hopkins, as well as earlier feeding studies carried out in Germany by Oskar Kellner. It included chemical analysis of animal feeds and research into ease of digestion of various crops. With J. W. Capstick, Thomas Deighton and others, he researched energy expenditure in pigs using calorimetry. With W. S. Mansfield, he studied the food requirements of farm animals including cattle, pigs and sheep, and modelled these mathematically, culminating in a 1928 paper (with Capstick) entitled "The scientific basis of rationing animals" which E. J. Russell, in his obituary for the Biochemical Journal, describes as likely to become a classic.

In 1905, Wood was one of the four founder editors of The Journal of Agricultural Science, and its first editor-in-chief, a position he retained until his death. He wrote several textbooks including The Story of a Loaf of Bread (1913), Food Economy in Wartime (1915; with Frederick Gowland Hopkins), The Chemistry of Crop Production (1920) and Animal Nutrition (1924), and was editing William Fream's Elements of Agriculture when he died. A review in Nature considers that Food Economy in Wartime "should be widely read and acted upon", praising its "clear style" as accessible to the lay reader. Later reviews in the same journal describe The Chemistry of Crop Production as "admirable" and "lucidly written", and its sequel Animal Nutrition as "excellent" in its description of practical applications.

== Awards and personal life ==
He received the CBE in 1918 for his work during the First World War. He was an elected fellow of the Royal Society (1919) and of the Institute of Chemistry, and received an honorary LL.D. degree from the University of Aberdeen (1926).

He married Margaret Isabel, the daughter of E. S. Beaven from Warminster; they had four children.

Wood died on 6 November 1929, at Saxlingham, near Holt in Norfolk, aged sixty. His funeral service was held at Gonville and Caius College Chapel in Cambridge, and a further memorial service was conducted at St Michael's Church. His remains were cremated at Golders Green Crematorium in London.

== Selected publications ==
Books

Sources:

- T. B. Wood. Animal Nutrition (University Tutorial Press, London; 1924)
- T. B. Wood. Rations for Livestock (1921); later revised in many editions by Herbert Ernest Woodman
- T. B. Wood, F. H. A. Marshall. Physiology of Farm Animals (Cambridge University Press; 1920)
- T. B. Wood. The Chemistry of Crop Production (W. B. Clive; 1920)
- T. B. Wood, Frederick Gowland Hopkins. Food Economy in Wartime (Cambridge University Press; 1915)
- T. B. Wood. The Story of a Loaf of Bread (Cambridge University Press; 1913)
- T. B. Wood. School of Agriculture, Cambridge. A Course of Practical Work in Agricultural Chemistry for Senior Students (Cambridge University Press; 1911)
- R. H. Adie, T. B. Wood. Agricultural Chemistry (2 volumes; Kegan Paul and Co; 1897)

Research papers

- J. W. Capstick, T. B. Wood (1922). The effect of change of temperature on the basal metabolism of swine. The Journal of Agricultural Science 12 (3): 257–68 doi:10.1017/S0021859600005311
- T. B. Wood, F. J. M. Stratton (1910). The Interpretation of Experimental Results. The Journal of Agricultural Science 3 (4): 417–40 doi:10.1017/S0021859600001210
- T. B. Wood (1905). Note on the Inheritance of Horns and Face Colour in Sheep. The Journal of Agricultural Science 1 (3): 364–65 doi:10.1017/S0021859600000393
- Thomas Barlow Wood, W. T. Newton Spivey, Thomas Hill Easterfield (1899). III.—Cannabinol. Part I. Journal of the Chemical Society, Transactions 75: 20–36 doi:10.1039/CT8997500020
