= Virender Lal Chopra =

Indian biotechnologist (1936–2020)

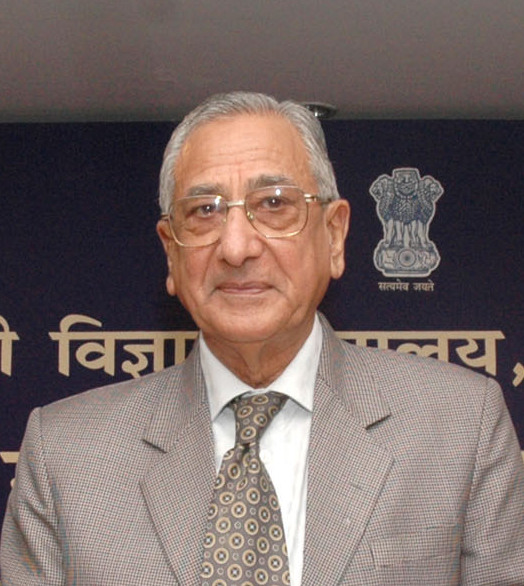
- Born: Virender Lal Chopra; 9 August 1936; Adhwal, Punjab, British India
- Died: 18 April 2020 (aged 83); New Delhi, Delhi, India
- Education: Delhi University; The University of Edinburgh; University of Cologne
- Occupations: Biotechnologist; Geneticist; Agriculturalist
- Years active: Since 1967
- Known for: Agricultural research
- Parents: Harbans Lal; Sukhwanti
- Awards: Padma Bhushan; Borlaug Award; Om Prakash Bhasin Award; Federation of Indian Chamber of Commerce and Industry Award; Honor Summus Medal; INSA Silver Jubilee Commemoration Medal; INSA Aryabhatta Medal; FAO World Food Day Award; NAAS Dr. B. P. Pal Award; ISCA Birbal Sahni Birth Centenary Award

Virender Lal Chopra (9 August 1936 – 18 April 2020) was an Indian biotechnologist, geneticist, agriculturalist and a director-general of the Indian Council of Agricultural Research (ICAR), known to have contributed to the development of wheat production in India. He was the chancellor of Central University of Kerala, a Chancellor of the Central Agricultural University, Imphal and a member of the Planning Commission of India. An elected fellow of several science academies such as Indian Academy of Sciences, Indian National Science Academy, National Academy of Agricultural Sciences, National Academy of Sciences, India, European Academy of Sciences and Arts and The World Academy of Sciences (TWAS), he was a recipient of a number of honors including Borlaug Award, FAO World Food Day Award and Om Prakash Bhasin Award. The Government of India awarded him the third highest civilian honour of the Padma Bhushan, in 1985, for his contributions to agricultural science.

== Biography ==
Virender Lal Chopra was born on 9 August 1936 in Adhwal, a small village in the Rawalpindi District of the Punjab Province of British India (now in Punjab, Pakistan), into a Punjabi Hindu Khatri family, to parents Harbans Lal and Sukhwanti. Chopra's family moved to Delhi before the Partition of India, where he did his early schooling at Ramjas School, Delhi. After securing his graduate degree with honours in agricultural science from Central College of Agriculture, Delhi University in 1955 and following it up with an associateship at the Indian Agricultural Research Institute (IARI) during 1955–57, he proceeded to the Institute of Genetics, University of Cologne on a senior Humboldt scholarship. Subsequently, he shifted his base to Edinburgh in 1964 and secured a doctoral degree (PhD) in Genetics from the Institute of Genetics of the University of Edinburgh in 1967, presenting the thesis "Tests for genetic effects of irradiated or chemically treated media in Drosophila and micro-organisms".

Chopra's career took prominence when he became the director of Indian Agricultural Research Institute (IARI) in 1979 which was his first major position where he was in charge of the planning and management of research in genetics and biotechnology. He stayed at the post for one year before turning to academics as the professor of genetics at the same institution, a post he held till 1985 when he moved to National Research Centre on Plant Biotechnology as a Professor of Eminence and the director of the centre. Simultaneously he served as a member of the scientific advisory committee to the Prime Minister of India from 1986 to 1990. He moved to Vietnam in 1990 as the chief technical adviser to the Government of Vietnam on a Food and Agriculture Organization (FAO) assignment which lasted 15 months. It was during this period, he assisted the Vietnam government in the establishment of the Agriculture Genetics Institute (AGI) in Hanoi. In 1992, the Government of India appointed him a secretary with the responsibility of the director-general of the Indian Council of Agricultural Research (ICAR), the apex agency in India for agricultural education and research. After his retirement from the ICAR in 1994, he continued his association with the agency as its B. P. Pal National Professor and in 2004, he was appointed as a member of the science council of the Consultative Group on International Agricultural Research (CGIAR), the largest research entity run on public funding in agriculture in the world. At CGIAR, he served as a member of several committees and boards of the member organizations and as its Regional Representative for Asia. During this period, he was also a member of the now-defunct Planning Commission of India, headed by Montek Singh Ahluwalia.

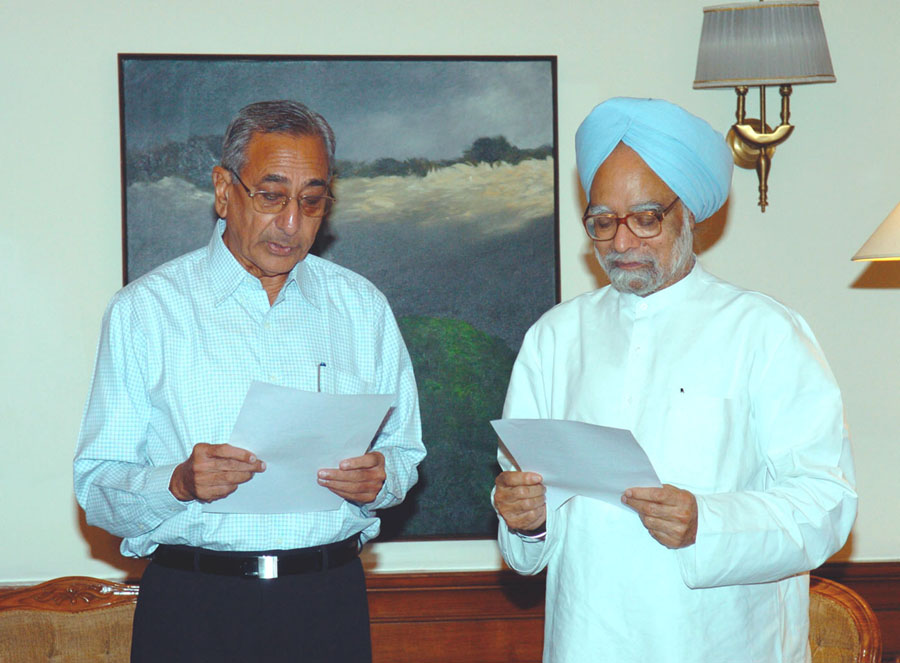
The Prime Minister Dr. Manmohan Singh administering the oath of office and secrecy as Member, Planning Commission to Dr. V.L. Chopra in New Delhi on August 26, 2004

Chopra died on April 18, 2020, in New Delhi.

== Positions and publications ==
Chopra served as the president of the International Genetics Federation from 1983 to 1988. He was a founder member of the Executive council of the National Academy of Agricultural Sciences and served as its president, secretary and vice-president during different tenures and was associated with the Indian National Science Academy in various capacities. He was a member of many trustee boards, MS Swaminathan Research Foundation, Gujarat State Fertilizers and Chemicals Research Foundation, Tea Research Association and Centre for Advancement of Sustainable Agriculture, counting among non governmental organizations and International Rice Research Institute (IRRI), International Crops Research Institute for the Semi-Arid Tropics (ICRISAT) and International Maize and Wheat Improvement Center (CYMMIT) featuring among the global research organizations. He was also a member of the Science Council of the Consultative Group for International Agricultural Research and a vice chairman (1989) of the International Board for Plant Genetic Resources, the present-day Bioversity International. He was the chancellor of the Central University of Kerala, appointed to the position in 2012.

Chopra was the author of many books and articles on plant breeding and genetics. Plant Breeding: Theory and Practice, Handbook of Industrial Crops, Breeding Field Crops and Search for New Genes are some of the notable books, the last one was co-written by Benjamin Peary Pal and R. P. Sharma. Approaches for Incorporating Drought and Salinity Resistance in Crop Plants, Technologies for Livelihood Enhancement, Genetics: Applied genetics, and Applied Plant Biotechnology are some of his other books. He presented papers at many science and agricultural conferences; Agricultural Biotechnology at the 2nd Asia Pacific Conference and Genetics, new frontiers at the XV International Congress of Genetics are two such papers.

== Awards and honors ==
Virender Chopra was awarded the Borlaug Award of the Coromandel Fertilisers in 1983. The Government of India included him in the Republic Day Honours list for the civilian award of the Padma Bhushan in 1985 and he was selected for the Federation of Indian Chamber of Commerce and Industry Award in 1986. The next year, he received two awards, Om Prakash Bhasin Award and Honor Summus Medal of the Watumull Foundation, USA. He was honored by Chandra Shekhar Azad University of Agriculture and Technology and Banaras Hindu University with the degree of Doctor of Science (DSc - honoris causa), both the honors reaching him in 1988. The Indian National Science Academy (INSA) awarded him their Silver Jubilee Commemoration Medal in 1991, INSA would award him again with the Aryabhatta Medal in 2002. He received the World Food Day Award of the Food and Agriculture Organization in 1993, Birbal Sahni Birth Centenary Award of the Indian Science Congress Association in 1997 and the National Academy of Agricultural Sciences (NAAS) awarded him the Dr. B. P. Pal Award in 2002.

Chopra was an elected fellow of the several science academies in India and abroad. The Indian Academy of Sciences (IAS) was the first to elect him in 1982, followed by the Indian National Science Academy (INSA) in 1984. The National Academy of Sciences, India (NASI) enrolled him as an elected fellow in 1988, with The World Academy of Sciences (TWAS) following suit in 1989 and the National Academy of Agricultural Sciences in 1990. Besides, Chandra Shekhar Azad University of Agriculture and Technology and Banaras Hindu University, four other universities honored him with honorary doctorates. He was one among the Indian scientists featured in the list of role model scientists in Reference Curve for Indian Role Model Scientists, a scientific study published in 2001 on the scientists and their work.

== Selected bibliography ==
- V. L. Chopra; B. C. Joshi; R. P. Sharma, H. C. Bansal (1984). Genetics: Applied genetics. Oxford & IBH Publishing.
- V. L. Chopra (1984). Genetics, new frontiers: proceedings of the XV International Congress of Genetics. International Congress of Genetics. ISBN 978-0-89059-037-9.
- V. L. Chopra; Rajendra Singh Paroda (1986). Approaches for Incorporating Drought and Salinity Resistance in Crop Plants. Oxford & IBH Publishing Company. ISBN 978-81-204-0151-8.
- V. L. Chopra (1989). Plant Breeding: Theory and Practice. Oxford & IBH Publishing Company. ISBN 978-81-204-0388-8.
- V. L. Chopra; R. P. Sharma; Monkombu Sambasivan Swaminathan (1996). Agricultural Biotechnology: 2nd Asia Pacific Conference. Science Publishers. ISBN 978-1-886106-78-9.
- V. L. Chopra; Vedpal S. Malik; S. R. Bhat (1999). Applied Plant Biotechnology. Science Publishers. ISBN 978-1-57808-033-5.
- V. L. Chopra (2001). Breeding Field Crops. Oxford Ibh. ISBN 978-81-204-1435-8.
- V. Chopra; K. Peter (12 July 2005). Handbook of Industrial Crops. Taylor & Francis. ISBN 978-1-56022-283-5.
- Benjamin Peary Pal; V. L. Chopra; R. P. Sharma (2007). Search for New Genes. Academic Foundation. ISBN 978-81-7188-632-6.
- V. L. Chopra (15 January 2015). Technologies for Livelihood Enhancement. New India Publishing Agency. ISBN 978-93-83305-81-0.

== See also ==
- List of University of Edinburgh people
- Central University of Kerala
