= The Journal of Agricultural Science =

- Discipline: Agricultural
- Language: English

Publication details
- History: 1905–present
- Publisher: Cambridge University Press

Standard abbreviations
- ISO 4: J. Agric. Sci.

Indexing
- ISSN: 0021-8596 (print); 1469-5146 (web)

Links
- Journal homepage

The Journal of Agricultural Science is a peer-reviewed scientific journal covering research on agriculture and the use of land resources. It was established in 1905 by Rowland Biffen, Alfred Daniel Hall, Thomas Barlow Wood, and Thomas Hudson Middleton and is published by Cambridge University Press.
