= Countryside Partnerships =

British housebuilding company

Countryside Partnerships plc
- Industry: Housebuilding
- Founded: 1958; 68 years ago
- Founder: Alan Cherry CBE
- Headquarters: Brentwood, Essex, England, UK
- Key people: John Martin, independent non-executive chairman and interim group chief executive officer
- Products: New Homes and Communities
- Revenue: ▲£1,371.4 million (2021)
- Operating income: ▲£71.3 million (2021)
- Net income: ▲£72.3 million (2021)
- Parent: Vistry Group (2022–present)
- Website: www.countrysidepartnerships.com

Countryside Partnerships plc, formerly Countryside Properties plc, is a UK housebuilding and urban regeneration company, operating mainly in London and the South East of England, but with a presence in the North West of England. Until 2022, it was listed on the London Stock Exchange and was a constituent of the FTSE 250 Index.

In November 2022, Vistry Group acquired Countryside Partnerships for £1.27 billion.

== History ==
=== Foundation and initial flotation ===
The housebuilding business that became Countryside Properties was founded in 1958 by Alan Cherry CBE, who remained its chairman until his death in January 2010. His eldest son, Graham Cherry, was appointed to the board in 1984 and was chief executive from 1996; his youngest son Richard Cherry was appointed to the board in 1986 and was appointed deputy chairman in 2005.

Alan Cherry, a chartered surveyor, began his career as an estate agent and was one of the founding partners of Bairstow Eves. In 1959, the four Bairstow partners formed Copthorn as a development business, with Alan Cherry running it part-time. One of the Bairstow clients was another developer, Countryside Properties, formed in 1958 by Solomon 'Bob' Bobroff, and in the late 1960s the two concerns began to work together. In 1972 Countryside acquired Copthorn and, with Bobroff as chairman and Alan Cherry as a joint managing director, Countryside was floated on the London Stock Exchange.

=== Return to private status ===
The flotation was closely followed by a recession and in 1975 Countryside passed its final dividend. Bobroff had resigned in 1974, and the subsequent expansion was under the sole direction of Alan Cherry. He emphasised the importance of design and marketing and took the company into a series of very large sites, e.g. Chelmer Village and Chatham Maritime. In 2005, Alan Cherry sought to take the company private. A prominent investor, Paul Kemsley and Joe Lewis's Rock Properties, increased its stake to 28.5%, forcing Cherry to pay more for the company. Countryside was bought out by Copthorn Holdings Ltd, which was then jointly owned by the Cherry family and the Bank of Scotland, part of Lloyds Banking Group.

The company achieved record profits in the following two years, amounting to £27 million on a turnover of £430 million in the year ended September 2007.

However, the Great Recession affected housebuilders acutely, and the company recorded a loss of £22 million on sales of £312 million in the year to September 2008. Under a refinancing deal in October 2009, Lloyds took control of the company.

In 2013, Oaktree Capital Management purchased a majority share in the company, making a further capital injection. The Cherry family retain a minority stake, and Lloyds provided five-year loan facilities. As of October 2014, former Keepmoat chief executive Ian Sutcliffe became the new executive chairman. In 2014 Oaktree acquired luxury home developer Millgate and merged it with Countryside, planning to double the company's size. Following this, the company rebranded as Countryside rather than Countryside Properties, adopting the slogan ‘Places People Love’.

In 2015, Countryside announced further changes to its board of directors. David Howell, previously a non-executive director, became chairman, whilst Ian Sutcliffe assumed the role of group chief executive officer. Graham Cherry became CEO new homes and communities, whilst Richard Cherry became CEO partnerships.

=== Second flotation ===
In February 2016 the company was the subject of an initial public offering on the London Stock Exchange.

In November 2019, Ian Sutcliffe announced he was stepping down as CEO to be replaced by Ian McPherson from 1 January 2020. In January 2022, McPherson was ousted after disappointing trading figures for the first three months of the financial year to December 2021 showed operating profit more than halved at £28m from £60m previously, on revenue down 28% to £429m. Peter Lee, a partner at US investment firm Browning West, one of Countryside’s largest shareholders, joined the board as non-executive director; Browning West had previously called for Countryside to be split into two parts to allow its Partnership business to thrive.

The company changed its name from Countryside Properties to Countryside Partnerships in January 2022.

in May 2022, Countryside was the target of a takeover bid by Inclusive Capital Partners (In-Cap), a San Francisco-based hedge fund. The Countryside board rejected this bid, but Browning West, which holds 15.3% of Countryside's shares, pressed the board to listen to offers, and, on 13 June, the board relented. The company's non-executive chairman, John Martin, quit a month later.

=== Vistry takeover ===
In September 2022, UK homebuilder Vistry Group offered a £1.24 billion cash and shares deal to acquire Countryside. The deal, backed by both boards and by five major shareholders at Countryside holding 39% of the company, will create one of the UK's biggest home builders with revenue of over £3bn. Countryside shareholders would receive 0.255 of a Vistry share for each of their shares plus 60p; if approved, the deal would be completed in early 2023. Vistry CEO Greg Fitzgerald said the Countryside brand would be retained if the takeover was approved by shareholders. In October 2022, Vistry published a timetable for the merger which was expected to complete on 11 November 2022. The transaction was approved by the High Court on 10 November 2022, so allowing the transaction to complete the following day.

== Projects ==
=== Developments ===
Great Notley Garden Village is an extension to the town of Braintree, Essex, built over a decade starting in 1993. As well as almost 2,000 homes in three separate 'hamlets', it has a primary school, church, community centre, doctors' surgery, supermarket, chip shop and village green. The Village is cited as an example of Countryside's design philosophy of 'maturity' and 'community'.

Great Kneighton is located 3.7 km south of Cambridge between the village of Trumpington, Cambridgeshire and Addenbrooke's Hospital, and lies in the Cambridge Southern Fringe growth area. The overall development will eventually provide up to 2,250 new homes, extensive strategic open space, accompanying provision of education facilities, sports and recreation, health and community facilities and local shopping facilities. Forty per cent of the new homes will be affordable housing.

The overall vision for Wickhurst Green is to provide an extension to the existing village of Broadbridge Heath, providing much-needed new homes and community facilities. At the heart of this new development will be a new primary school and village centre, creating the opportunity for new community and healthcare facilities. Integral to the development is the provision of a wide range of outdoor activities for sports and recreation. As well as local greens and landscaped spaces for informal recreation, residents will be able to enjoy two large neighbourhood play areas designed for a range of age groups, several formal sports pitches and courts with changing, parking and social facilities.

Beaulieu is a sustainable urban extension to the North East of Chelmsford. Countryside are working in a joint venture with London & Quadrant to create a sustainable community on 850 acres in a highly accessible location between the A130 and the A12 at the Boreham Interchange. Key elements of the overall proposals include a mixed-use residential and commercial development providing up to 3,600 new mixed-tenure homes, and a site for a new railway station - one of only a handful of new station proposals in the UK which has full rail industry support.

=== Regeneration ===
Greenwich Millennium Village Limited, a joint venture between Countryside and Taylor Wimpey, won a government-initiated competition in February 1998 to transform the former site of Europe's largest gas works into a sustainable new community. It is one of the largest regeneration projects in Europe. The Village won a sustainability award at the RIBA Housing Design Awards and a Civic Trust Award in 2004. 1,095 homes had been completed by 2008, and further phases are planned.

In 2008, Guinness Trust chose Countryside in 2008 as contractor for regeneration of the Loughborough Park Estate in Brixton, south London. The project includes replacing 390 homes built in the 1930s with 530 new homes and community facilities.

== Controversies ==
=== Ground rent ===
In 2017, it was reported that Countryside was selling properties with doubling Ground rent terms written into the leasehold contracts of purchasers, such terms are considered by mortgage lenders such as Nationwide Building Society to be "unfair" and ones that they would be unwilling to lend on. In light of increasing media coverage, Countryside signalled it would attempt to 'buy back' freeholds and amend terms for some leaseholders affected by 10 year doubling ground rents, by linking increases to Retail price index. Subsequently, the government has turned attention to what it views as abuse of the Leasehold system and announced a raft of measures, including capping future ground rents at zero for future new build homes.

=== Cladding ===
In 2018, following the Grenfell Tower fire, a fire service investigation deemed the cladding unsafe on the NV Buildings in Salford Quays. The buildings were developed in 2004 by Countryside and built by Carillion, which had gone into liquidation in January 2018. Householders were told the costs to replace the cladding would have to be met by them. So far, Countryside has not said whether it will pay, although developers Taylor Wimpey and Barratt have done so elsewhere on "moral" grounds, despite not being legally required to. A structural engineer, contracted by residents, reviewed the buildings in June 2018. The report concluded that the use of expanded polystyrene (EPS) and gaps in fire breaks on external walls meant the development may not have complied with building regulations when built. Countryside said NV Buildings received all relevant approvals when Carillion completed the project. Countryside was undertaking a "comprehensive review" of the building's design and construction. In 2019, the developer billed leaseholders to cover the £2.6m cost of replacing the cladding, with costs ranging from £12,000 to £34,000.

== Awards ==
In 2008 its Accordia development in Cambridge was the first housing scheme to win the RIBA Stirling Prize for architecture. The same project had previously been the Overall Winner & Medium Housebuilder Winner of the RIBA Housing Design Award 2006, repeating the awards which the company had won in 2004 and 2005.

In 2013 its Villa house type at Kings Park, Harold Wood, won the silver award in the 'Best House' category, as part of the What House? Awards. It also won the silver award in the 'Best Retirement Development' category for Cliveden Village, Taplow. Its Horsted Park development in Chatham was named as 'Housing Project of the Year' at the 2013 Building Awards.

Countryside together with its partner Liberty Property Trust received the ‘Place Making Award’ for the Cambridge Biomedical Campus at the Property Awards 2014. Countryside in association with Royal National Institute of Blind People received the BBC/RHS People's Choice Award following their earlier accolades of Gold Medal and the award for Best Fresh Garden at the RHS Chelsea Flower Show 2014.
