= John Capstick =

John Capstick may refer to:

- John H. Capstick, American politician
- John Walton Capstick, bursar of Trinity College, Cambridge
