= Benjamin Peary Pal =

Indian agricultural scientist (1906–1989)

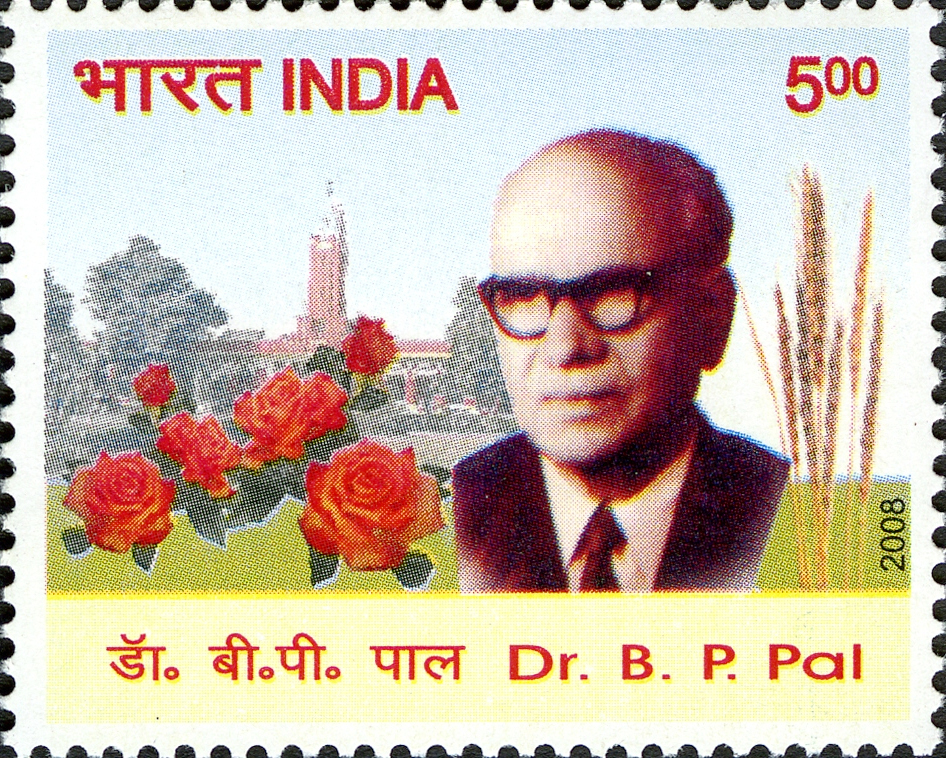
- Born: 26 May 1906; Mukandpur, Punjab, British India
- Died: 14 September 1989 (aged 83)
- Education: Rangoon University (BSc, MSc); University of Cambridge (PhD)
- Awards: FRS; Padma Vibhushan (1987)
- Scientific career
- Fields: Plant breeding
- Workplaces: Indian Council of Agricultural Research
- Doctoral advisor: Rowland Biffen, Frank Engledow

Benjamin Peary Pal or B. P. Pal FRS (26 May 1906 – 14 September 1989) was an Indian plant breeder and agronomist who served as a director of the Indian Agricultural Research Institute in Delhi and as the first Director General of the Indian Council of Agricultural Research. He worked on wheat genetics and breeding but was also known for his interest in rose varieties.

== Biography ==
Pal was born in Mukandpur, the youngest child of Dr Rala Ram and Inder Devi. The family came from Jalandhar but his father moved to Burma as a medical officer. He was born Brahma Das Pal but changed his name to Benjamin Peary Pal while at St Michael's School in Maymyo in 1914. A rose garden at the school may have inspired his early interest in them. He completed his Bachelor of Science in biology and Master of Science degrees at Rangoon University in botany, with a study on Burmese Charophyta for his master's. He then went for his doctoral studies at the University of Cambridge in biology under Rowland Biffen and later Frank Engledow, studying hybrid vigour in wheat. He then worked as a rice research officer in Burma in 1932 and then moved to Pusa in Bihar as a second economic botanist. He became an Imperial Economic Botanist at the Imperial Agricultural Research Institute in 1937. In 1936, the institute moved to New Delhi following an earthquake. He moved there and became the director of the institute in September 1950. In 1954, after 18 years of research, he developed the 'NP 809' wheat. This variety of wheat could combat all three types of rust (a crop disease). He became the first director-general of the newly reorganized Indian Council for Agricultural Research in 1965 and worked there until his retirement in 1972. Pal worked on rust resistance in wheat and helped release several varieties.

Pal founded the Rose and Bougainvillea Societies of India, the Indian Society of Genetics and Plant Breeding while also serving as the editor of its journal.

== Awards and honours ==
He was elected a Fellow of the Royal Society (FRS) in 1972. He was a bachelor and donated his property to the Indian Council of Agricultural Research.

- Awarded the Padma Shri in 1959,
- Awarded Padma Bhushan in 1968

A rose garden from the library at the Indian Agricultural Research Institute is named in his honour.
