= Maris Piper =

Variety of potato

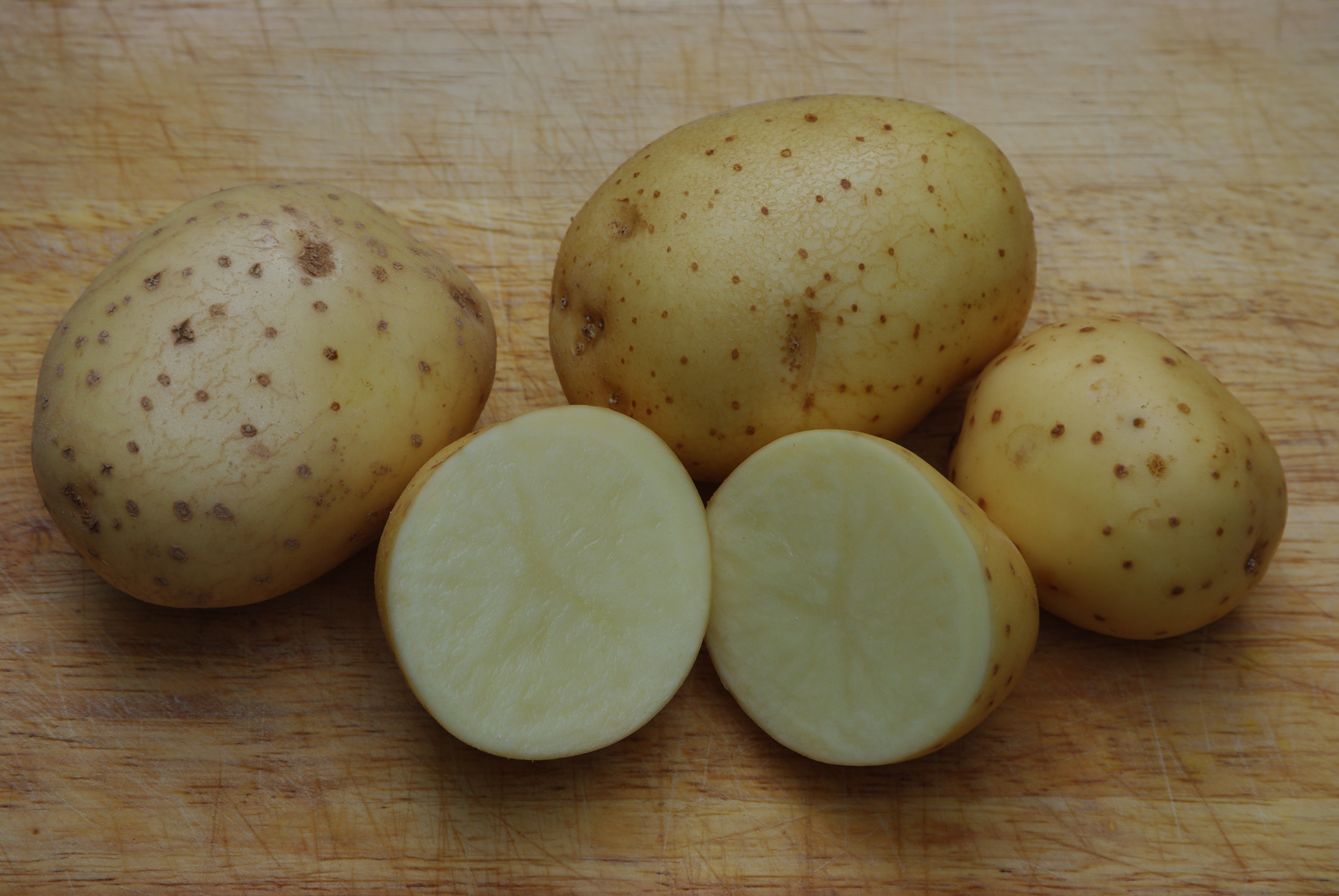
- Tubers of Maris Piper
- Genus: Solanum
- Species: Solanum tuberosum
- Cultivar: 'Maris Piper'
- Breeder: H.W. Howard
- Origin: Plant Breeding Institute, Trumpington, Cambridgeshire, Britain 1956

Maris Piper is the most widely grown potato variety in the United Kingdom accounting for 16% of the planted area in 2014. Introduced in 1966 it was one of the first potato varieties bred to be resistant to a form of potato cyst nematode, a major pest of potato production in the UK. It has been the most widely grown variety in the UK since 1980 and is suitable for a range of uses including chips, roast potatoes and mashed potatoes.

== Breeding ==
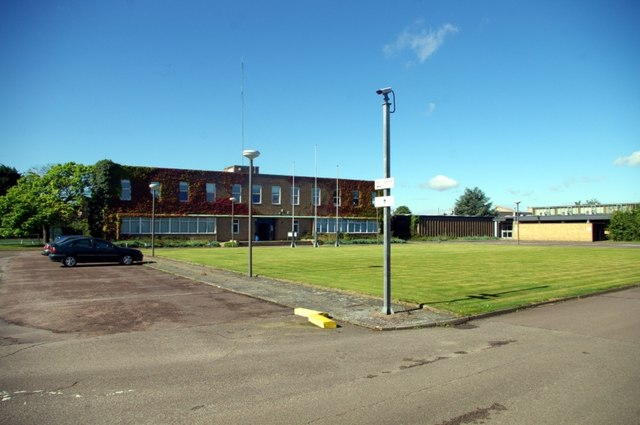
The Maris Building in Trumpington where Maris Piper was developed

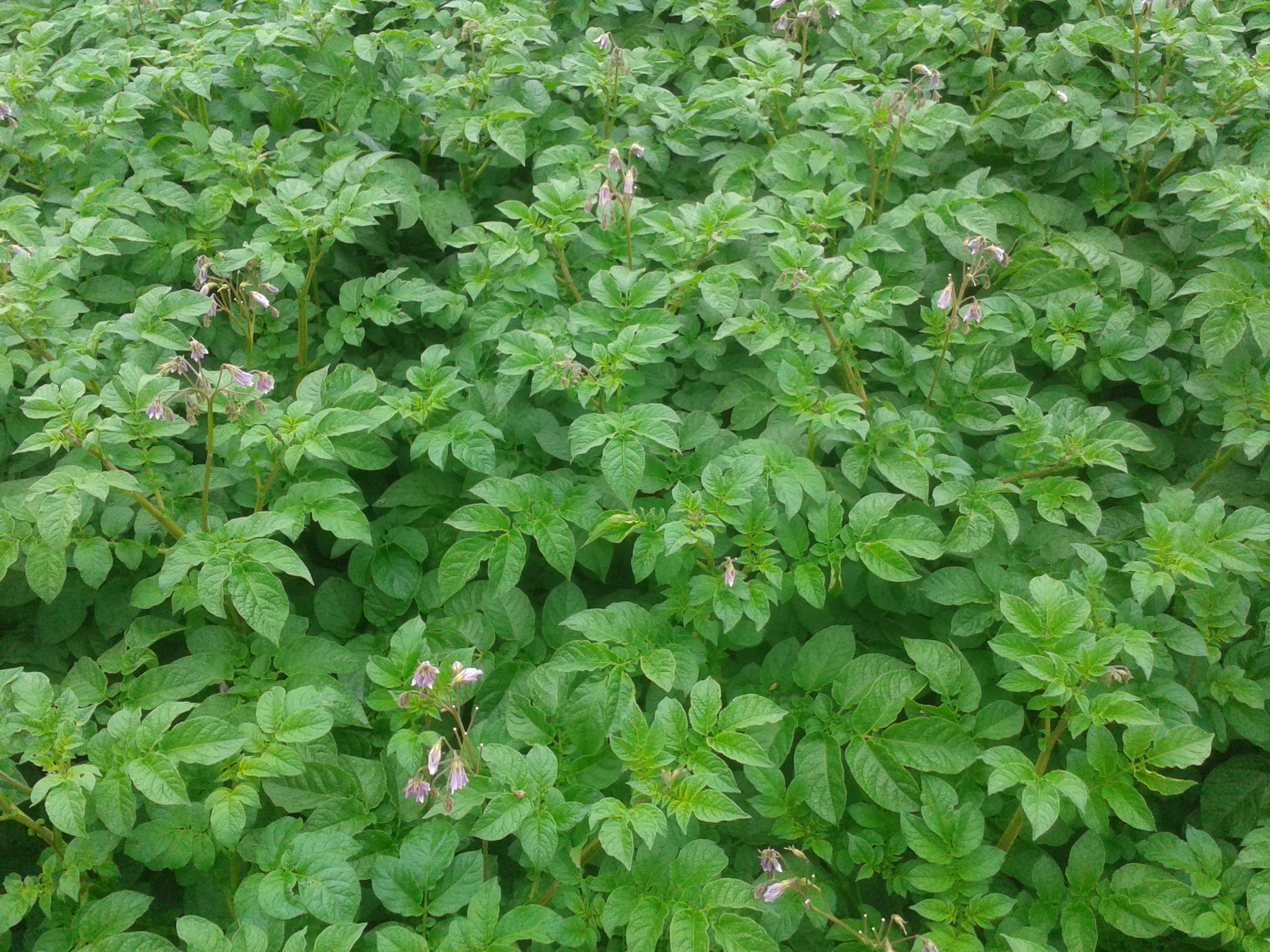
The leaves of Maris Piper

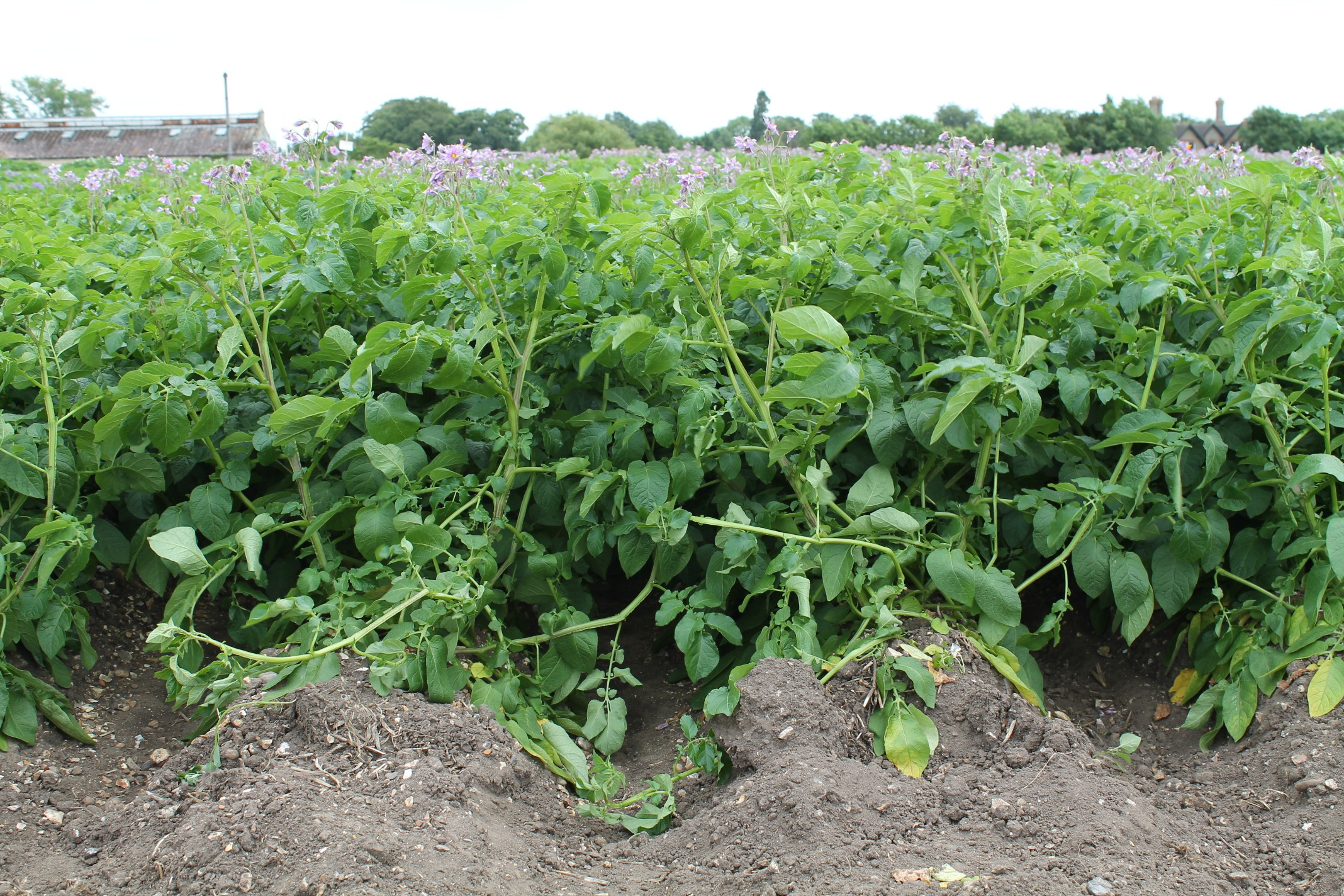
A side view of a crop of Maris Piper in flower

Attempts to find resistance to the potato cyst nematode Globodera rostochiensis in wild potatoes began in 1941, when Conrad Ellenby started testing over 60 species held in the Commonwealth Potato Collection, finding that few were resistant or suitable to breed with cultivated potatoes. In a letter to Nature in 1952, Ellenby reported that by 1948 he had found four types that were resistant and could be crossed with contemporary varieties. All four were the species Solanum tuberosum andigena, and one of these, CPC 1673, was the source of nematode resistance in Maris Piper. Although resistant to PCN, the wild potato produced very small tubers in the UK climate.

Led by H. W. Howard, workers at the Plant Breeding Institute in Cambridge crossed the wild potato with contemporary varieties to produce a high-yielding, resistant variety. CPC 1673 was backcrossed, crossed with Ulster Knight, and then crossed with a cross of Arran Cairn and Herald. Arran Cairn was bred by Donald Mackelvie, the leading Scottish potato breeder in the early 20th century, and Ulster Knight was bred by John Clarke, an eminent potato breeder from County Antrim. The final cross was made in 1956, but it took another ten years for the variety to be tested and multiplied before it was recommended by the National Institute of Agricultural Botany in 1966. The PBI and Howard were awarded the Queen's Award for Technology in 1982 for breeding Maris Piper.

The first part of the variety's name came from Maris Lane in Trumpington where the Plant Breeding Institute was located. By convention, the breeder got to choose the second name, with Piper chosen arbitrarily by Howard's son, although earlier, he had proposed calling it Maris Pard. It should not be confused with Maris Peer, another variety of potato.

== Usage ==
The variety was the most popular in the UK by 1980, accounting for 24% of the British potato crop in 1982, 20% in 2005 and 16% in 2014. It became popular due to both its resistance to nematodes and its pleasing taste for consumers.

Maris Piper has a fluffy texture and is considered an "all-rounder" potato. It is widely used to make chips (French fries) due to it having high dry matter and low reducing sugars. As well as being sold fresh, the variety is also suitable for processing into frozen or dehydrated products.

It has been recommended by chefs Heston Blumenthal and Tom Kerridge for making triple cooked chips. In his book Perfection, Blumenthal stated they were "in a league of their own" for making roast potatoes and he also considers them the best variety for mashed potatoes.

== Traits ==
Maris Piper is one of the most susceptible potato varieties to being eaten by slugs, and also the bacterial disease common scab, which causes corky lesions to form on the skin. Common scab is controlled by irrigating crops just as the potatoes begin to form, requiring "perfect timing and perfect irrigation".

Maris Piper was one of the first varieties with resistance to G. rostochiensis, with the H1 gene giving complete resistance to UK strains. The widespread growth of Maris Piper led to the closely related G. pallida (to which Maris Piper has no resistance) becoming the main potato cyst nematode in the UK. When nematodes feed on the roots, the H1 gene results in the potato roots dying, preventing the nematodes from feeding and making it likely they die or turn into males. H1 is thought to encode a protein that specifically detects the product of one nematode gene during feeding, a so-called gene-for-gene relationship.
