= Plant Breeding Institute =

Research institute in Cambridge, UK

Coordinates: 52°13′5″N 0°5′15″E

The Plant Breeding Institute was an agricultural research organisation in Cambridge in the United Kingdom between 1912 and 1987.

== Founding ==
The institute was established in 1912 as part of the School of Agriculture at the University of Cambridge. Rowland Biffen was the first director, and was close with William Bateson who was leading studies of heredity in Cambridge following the rediscovery of the pioneering genetic research of Gregor Mendel in 1900. Biffen began studying cereal breeding in the early 1900s with the aim of producing improved varieties for farmers and millers, and also to test whether Mendel's laws applied to wheat. He demonstrated that resistance to yellow rust was a dominant trait and this culminated in 1910 in the release of the rust-resistant variety Little Joss, which was widely grown for decades and used as a parent for many other varieties.

The institute's site was to the west of Cambridge, and it shared land with the School of Agriculture that is today the site of the North West Cambridge development. The first research students were J. W. Lesley – who later made important contributions to the genetics of the tomato – and Frank Engledow, who later became Drapers Professor of Agriculture. Engledow described the facilities as "two acres of land on Gravel Hill Farm, a cage, a not very large shed and a small greenhouse."

Work was initially mundane, consisting of recording the yields of different wheat varieties, but led to the release of Yeoman in 1916, which combined high yields with strength (the quality required for bread-making). During the First World War, research at the institute ground to a halt, but it began to rapidly expand afterwards and into the 1920s when two new research stations were attached to the institute, the Horticultural Research Station in 1922 and the Potato Virus Station in 1926. Redcliffe N. Salaman was the director of the latter until 1939.

The National Institute of Agricultural Botany was established in 1919 in order to separate the commercial aspects of varietal improvement from the more academic pursuits at the PBI. NIAB would distribute the seed of new varieties produced at the PBI, but only after testing showed them to be distinct and superior to existing varieties. This arrangement effectively discouraged workers at the PBI from developing new varieties and freed them to study plant physiology and genetics. In the 1920s, Engledow collaborated with the statistician Udny Yule to develop techniques to analyse crop yields and published a series of papers on yield formation and associated traits in cereals. Salaman developed methods to test for the presence of viruses in seed potatoes and developed techniques to build up stocks of virus-free seed potatoes, a technique adopted by many other countries. Yeoman II was released in 1925 but was a commercial failure, and marked the high point of Mendelian thinking in UK plant breeding.

Biffen retired in 1936 and recommended Herbert Hunter, a barley breeder with close links to Guinness and who had worked at the PBI since 1922, become the new director. Unlike his predecessor, Hunter disputed the necessity of Mendelian thinking to varietal improvement, instead believing that success relied on finding parents with desirable traits and crossing them with existing popular varieties. The appointment was doubted by Alfred Daniel Hall, the founder of Wye College because Hunter was "a plant breeder and not a geneticist". During the 1930s the PBI released high-yielding barley varieties, but their poor malting quality meant that they were not adopted by farmers.

George Douglas Hutton Bell was the director from 1940 to 1971. From the late 1940s to the 1960s, the low price of barley in comparison to meat made it an attractive animal feed, creating a niche for the PBI's barley varieties that led to them dominating the UK barley market.

== Move to Trumpington ==
In 1948 it was announced that the institute would move from its site on Cambridge University Farm to a new site with improved facilities and more staff. At the same time, management would be transferred away from the university to a new independent body. The new site was opened in Trumpington, 2 miles south of Cambridge, in 1955.

Ralph Riley was the director from 1971 to 1978. Richard B. Flavell joined in 1969 and built up a large department investigating plant molecular genetics.

== Privatisation ==
The institute was privatised in 1987 as part of Margaret Thatcher's government policies to divest from profitable industries and that "near-market" agricultural research should be funded by industry rather than the state. At the time the institute's wheat varieties had 90% of the UK market and 86% of the cereal acreage.

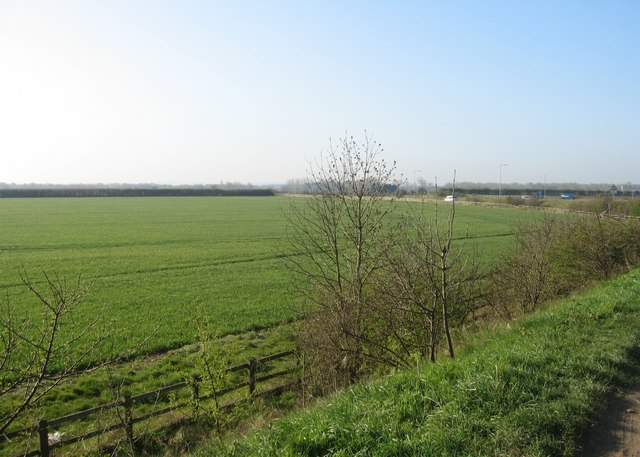
Farmland in 2008, once owned by the Institute

The plant breeding parts of the institute were sold to Unilever for £68m, and sold on a year later to Monsanto for £350m. The more research-orientated parts were moved to form 'The Cambridge Laboratory' in Norwich, which later merged with the John Innes Centre. In 2004, Monsanto sold the wheat breeding part of the business to RAGT Seeds and in 2008 the institute moved from Trumpington to a new headquarters in Essex, between Sawston and Saffron Walden. The impact of the privatisation on wheat breeding has been studied by several authors.

== Notable cultivars ==
=== Barley ===
- Pioneer – the first winter-hardy malting barley
- Proctor – a spring barley
- Maris Otter – a cross of Pioneer and Proctor that remains popular with craft brewers

=== Potatoes ===
- Maris Peer – an early potato variety
- Maris Piper – a maincrop potato variety with resistance to the potato cyst nematode Globodera rostochiensis; the most popular UK potato variety since 1980

=== Wheat ===
- Maris Wigeon
- Yeoman
- Maris Huntsman
