= James Beament =

British scientist

Sir James William Longman Beament FRS (17 November 1921 – 10 March 2005) was a British scientist who studied insect physiology and psychoacoustics. He has been described as "an international authority" on "the structure and waterproofing of insect eggs".

== Early life and education ==
Beament was born on 17 November 1921 at Ashlands Farm near the Somerset town of Crewkerne, the only child of Tom and Elisabeth Beament (née Munden). The farm had been in the family since at least 1670, and probably since 1419.

As a boy, Beament had a great love of music. His mother has been quoted as saying that he "would wait for the Salvation Army band on Sundays, 'like a cat waiting for the fishmonger'". she said. He was a scholarship student at Crewkerne Grammar School beginning in 1931.

Winning an Exhibition to read Mathematics, Physics and Chemistry at Queens' College, Cambridge, Beament went up in 1940. He studied under Alexander Wood, whose lectures and writings about the physics of sound led to a lifelong interest in acoustics. After having his first exposure to the work of classical composers, Beament taught himself to read music. He also founded Queens' College's amateur dramatic society, the Bats.

It was wartime, and Beament was obliged to join the 8th Cambridge Home Guard. On the suggestion of C. P. Snow, he devoted his third year at Cambridge to zoology, with a focus on insects.

He received a B.A. and M.A. from Cambridge in 1943, earning a First. He then proceeded to the London School of Hygiene & Tropical Medicine (later the London School of Tropical Medicine, LSTM), where an older colleague, Vincent Wigglesworth, "told him that more people had died in the First World War from insect-borne diseases than had been killed in action" and that his assignment would be "to find out how to permeate insect skins", which were covered in a thin layer of wax. "Wigglesworth stimulated [Beament's] interest in the wetting and waterproofing properties of the insect integument or cuticle, a topic that was to be a dominant theme in his scientific career", according to one source.

Beament's research into this question led to five major scientific publications in which he showed how poisons could be introduced into insects. He also worked with the head of the LSTM, P. A. Buxton, on lice, which played a major role in transmitting typhus on the Eastern front. In addition, he played a role in DDT experiments that confirmed the ability of DDT to kill lice, and that helped prevent a typhus epidemic in Naples in 1944. Since Beament's and Wigglesworth's research required large numbers of lice, Beament, to keep them alive, "went around with aluminium tins tucked inside his socks 16 hours a day with the lice feeding off himself which just about kept up with the experimental demand".

When Wigglesworth moved to Cambridge to become a Reader in Entomology and to run the Agricultural Research Council (ARC) Unit of Insect Physiology, Beament accepted an invitation to join him there while continuing to work in London on his PhD on insect eggs. He received the PhD in 1946.

== Career ==
After receiving his PhD, Beament remained at Cambridge, where he worked on fly, tick, and red spider mite eggs and made a number of important discoveries. In 1955 he resumed research on insect waxes and waterproofing.

In 1960 he submitted his Cambridge Sc.D., which consisted of four large papers, two reviews, and a letter to Nature. In the same year, he organised the second SEB Symposium and chose "Biological Receptor Mechanisms" as the theme. A keynote lecture by Georg von Békésy stirred Beament's interest in the science of hearing and music, which would be a major subject of his research for the rest of his life.

After he was named a Fellow and Tutor of Queens' College in 1961, Beament was increasingly involved in administrative work and in tutoring graduate and research students. Although "some of the older Fellows of Queens' had thought him a bit too unorthodox to fit the staid collegiate culture," they "soon realized the immense value that he added to the Fellowship," given the ease with which he dealt with students. Long an advocate of integrating courses in related subjects, such as zoology, botany, and genetics, Beament helped design an integrated course "that in essence survived within the Natural Sciences Tripos well into the following century".

In 1968, at the request of the Royal Society, Beament went to Ghana to advise that country's government on the effective utilisation of Lake Volta.

At Cambridge, Beament held the title of Principal Scientific Officer at the ARC from 1946 to 1960 and was named a Lecturer in Zoology in 1961. He was appointed Reader in Insect Physiology in 1966, and Drapers Professor of Agriculture and Chairman of the Department of Agriculture in 1969. His mandate was to convert the Department of Agriculture into a Department of Applied Biology, in fulfilment of recommendations he had made himself in a report to the university.

He received a knighthood in 1980, and retired from Cambridge in 1989.

He continued to work, however. He studied the acidification of lakes in his role as Chairman of the Biological Research Advisory Committee of the Central Electricity Generating Board, and concluded that the problem was not caused mainly by acid rain, as was then generally believed, but chiefly by organic acids produced by the decay of moss and of pine tree litter, a problem that was quickly resolved. This finding received insufficient public attention because "it was not what the media wanted to hear".

He also worked on a project that resulted in a preservative coating for bananas allowing them to be transported without refrigeration. In addition, he researched the pollination process. In his last papers, he returned to the subject of insect eggs, discovering that "Culex mosquito eggs fitted together like Lego bricks".

=== Music ===
While working in the Department of Applied Biology, Beament also taught courses in acoustics under the auspices of the Music Department. After retiring from the Advisory Research Committee in 1989, Beamont wrote The Violin Explained (1997), in which he provided scientific explanations of the workings of that instrument. The Strad, reviewing The Violin Explained, said that it provided "a comprehensive look at what is known about the mechanics of the violin family", explained in "a very readable and non-mathematical style...the nature of sound production", and "confront[ed] the question of tone assessment". A colleague described the book as “address[ing] the age-old problems of string tension, glue and varnish". He subsequently gave a series of lectures on the topic, including one to the British Violin Makers Association in 1999.

Beament then wrote How We Hear Music (2001), in which he explained the human response to harmony. According to a colleague, he had been thinking about writing such a book "ever since he had met von Békésy in 1961". The book was based on a paper that he had published in 1977.

Reviewing How We Hear Music, which it "recommended warmly" for "virtually every college, university and professional music library", Choice Magazine described "Beament('s) model for the hearing of music" as "not only the most speculative section of the book but also the most brilliant". In a 1997 article for the BBC Music Magazine headlined “Smashing the Strad myth”, Beament dismissed as a myth the popular notion that the Stradivarius produces a sound superior to that produced by other violins. He also answered the question “What is a tune?” for a Q-&-A feature in The Guardian.

In his later years he composed a string octet, two string sextets, and a string quintet. The response of the classic musical world to his first string sextet, according to one colleague, "probably gave him more pleasure than any of his scientific publications".

=== Overview ===
After Beament's death, a colleague called him a "polymath" with "extraordinary energy" who over the course of his career was driven by "two dominant scientific passions", namely "insect physiology and the mechanism of hearing (and psychoacoustics)". Beament's research field, the colleague wrote, "remained very much his own....Jimmie never had time for research that needed the newest, biggest or most expensive bits of kit. Rather he preferred to choose problems that had never been solved because the means of attacking the problem did not exist". Consequently, Beament and his collaborators "designed and built innovative, specialized equipment – he was a precision engineer as well as a scientist".

== Other professional activities ==
Beament was chief editor of the Journal of Agricultural Science from 1970 to 1989, and edited multiple volumes of Advances in Insect Physiology.

== Honors and awards ==
- In 1963, Beament was awarded the Scientific Medal of the Zoological Society of London. In 1964 he was elected a Fellow of the Royal Society. In the same year the General Board of Cambridge University made him chairman of a committee on "The Future of Agriculture".
- He held the title of Fellow and Tutor at Queens' College, Cambridge, from 1961 to 1969, and was a Vice-President of Queens' College from 1981 to 1986 and a Life Fellow from 1989 to 2005.
- In 1989 he was awarded the Grundy Medal of the Royal College of Military Science.

== Memberships ==
- Beament was a member of the Society for Experimental Biology from early in his career. In 1953 he was elected its Zoological Secretary.
- He was made a Member of the Composer's Guild of Great Britain in 1967, and was a Syndic of Cambridge University Press beginning around 1970.
- In 1970 he became a member of the National Environmental Research Council, and was its chairman, and an ex-officio member of its advisory board, from 1977 to 1981.
- He was a member of the International Bee Research Association, and was its vice-president in the late 1980s.

== Personal life ==
Beament married his first wife, Monica, during the war, and she returned to Cambridge with him, but they were divorced in the early 1950s. He met his second wife, Joyce Quinney, in a theatre group at Cambridge after his return there in 1947; she went on to play leading roles in several productions by the Bats. She died in 1960. On 18 June 1962 he was married a third time, to Sara Juliet Barker, a violin maker who later wrote a book entitled Violin Making. They met through the Cambridge Technical College orchestra, in which she played the viola and he played the double bass. They had two children, Thomas and Christopher.

Beament devoted a great deal of his life to amateur music and theatre productions. He composed incidental music for many Cambridge shows, was a gifted jazz improviser at the piano, was an officer of the Cambridge Amateur Dramatic Club, and wrote operettas for College May Week concerts.

A Sunday Times (London) article about a debate at Cambridge over a proposal for co-ed dormitories noted that Beament supported the proposal, saying that one question being debated was “whether people in the age group we are considering should obtain sexual experience”. He said: “I am not alone in believing that they should.”

== Selected works ==
- 1945 The cuticular lipoids of insects. J. Exp. Biol. 21, 115–131.
- 1946 The waterproofing process in eggs of Rhodnius prolixus Stahl. Proc. R. Soc. B 133, 407–417.
- The formation and structure of the chorion of the egg in hemipteran Rhodnius prolixus. Q. J. Microsc. Sci. 87, 393–438.
- 1947 The formation and structure of the micro-pylar complex in the egg-shell of Rhodnius prolixus Stahl. J. Exp. Biol. 23, 213–233.
- 1948 Laboratory studies on the egg of the blowfly Lucilia sericata. J. Exp. Biol. 25, 71–85.
- (With A. D. Lees) An egg-waxing organ in ticks. Q. J. Microsc. Sci. 89, 291–331.
- The penetration of the insect egg-shells. I. Penetration of the chorion of Rhodnius prolixus Stahl. Bull. Ent. Res. 39, 359–383.
- 1949 The penetration of insect egg-shells. II. The properties and permeability of sub-chorial membranes during development of Rhodnius prolixus Stahl. Bull. Ent. Res. 39, 467–487.
- 1950 The hatching mechanism of muscid eggs (Diphera). J. Exp. Biol. 27, 437–445.
- (With V. B. Wigglesworth) The respiratory mechanisms of some insect eggs. Q. J. Microsc. Sci. 91, 429–451.
- 1951 The structure and formation of the egg of the fruit tree red spider mite, Metatetranychus ulmi Koch. Ann. Appl. Biol. 38, 1–23.
- 1954 Water transport in insects. Symp. Soc. Exp. Biol. 8, 94–116.
- 1955 Wax Secretion in the cockroach. J. Exp. Biol. 32, 514–538.
- 1958 A paralysing agent in the blood of cockroaches. J. Insect Physiol. 2, 199–214.
- (With K. E. Machin) Thermostat suitable for controlling air temperature, particularly in biological research. J. Scient. Instrum. 36, 87–89.
- The effect of temperature on the water-proofing mechanism of an insect. J. Exp. Biol. 35, 494–518.
- 1959 The waterproofing mechanism of arthropods. I. The effect of temperature on cuticle permeability in terrestrial insects and ticks. J. Exp. Biol. 36, 391–422.
- 1960 The waterproofing mechanism of arthropods. II. The permeability of the cuticle of some aquatic insects. J. Exp. Biol. 38, 277–290.
- 1961 Electrical properties of orientated lipid on a biological membrane. Nature 191, 217–221.
- 1962 The surface properties of insects—some evolutionary and ecological implications. Proc. Linn. Soc. Lond. 173, 115–119.
- 1963 (With J. Noble-Nesbitt & J. A. L. Watson) The waterproofing mechanism of arthropods. III. Cuticular permeability in the firebrat, Thermobia domestica (Packard). J. Exp. Biol. 41, 323–330.
- 1965 (ed., with John Treherne). Physiology of the Insect Central Nervous System (Academic Press)
- 1977 The biology of music. Psychol. Music 5, 3–17.
- 1981 (With S. A. Corbet) Surface properties of Culex pipiens pipiens eggs and the behaviour of the female during egg-raft assembly. Physiol. Ent. 6, 135–148.
- 1982 (With S. A. Corbet & D. Eisikowitch) Are electrostatic forces involved in pollen transfer? Plant Cell Envir. 5, 125–129.
- 1997 The violin explained. Oxford University Press.
- 1999 String Sextet, Opus 50 (for 2 violins, 2 violas, 2 'cellos). Lancaster: Phylloscopus Publications PP313.
- 2001 How we hear music: the relationship between music and the hearing mechanism. Woodbridge: Boydell Press.
