= JIC Germplasm Resources Unit =

Germplasm conservation unit in Norwich, England

- Headquarters: Norwich, UK
- Key people: Noam Chayut; Simon Orford; Richard Horler; Simon Griffiths; Saleha Bakht
- Affiliations: John Innes Centre
- Website: www.jic.ac.uk/research-impact/germplasm-resource-unit/

The Germplasm Resources Unit is part of the John Innes Centre. Located in the Norwich Research Park, Norwich, England, is a germplasm conservation unit and National Capability supported by the Biotechnology and Biological Sciences Research Council. This unit houses a number of internationally recognised reference- and working-collections for wheat, oats, barley and peas, which serves UK and non-UK based academic, industrial and non-industrial groups.

== History ==
The collections from the Germplasm Resources Unit were brought together in the mid-1980s from working collection from several research institutes from around the UK that worked with small grain cereals and legumes, including the extinct Plant Breeding Institute. This centralisation effort was supported by the John Innes Institute, and was designed to act as an open collection that would provide access to important resources for ongoing research and breeding.

The connection of the unit and the JIC has the advantage of placing germplasm material on sites of active research where a higher level of interaction with the scientific community is possible. This two-way interaction ensures that scientists and students are exposed to, and have greater opportunities to view and discuss genetic variability, while affording staff involvement in research objectives and priorities within both basic and strategic applied science.

In 2012 the unit became a National Capability supported by the Biotechnology and Biological Sciences Research Council as part of its new funding arrangements.

In recent times, cereal collections have been successfully screened for many traits leading to the identification of new sources of disease resistance to a range of diseases as well as tolerance to drought, salinity and aluminium.

== Collections ==
The Germplasm Resources Unit houses a diverse range of seed collections, accounting for more than 20,000 accessions. The seeds are stored in a special low temperature, low humidity facility and a complete list of accessions can be found in the SeedStor, the unit's database, which was released at the end of 2014.

The oldest collection kept in unit is the Watkins Landrace Wheat Collection, which has a variety of wheat landraces cultivars acquired by A.E. Watkins in the 1930s from 32 different countries in Asia, Europe and Africa. Because the samples were collected before modern plant breeding efforts and the green revolution, it is a very interesting source of genetic variability for novel agronomic trait discovery. The collection was screened in 2014 by John Innes Centre researchers, and a great level of genetic diversity was found.

The Small Grain Cereal Collection is the largest in the UK and originated from a series of working collections from different plant breeding and research institutes from the UK. The collection was produced alongside public sector breeding programmes, and has the potential to be a source of important traits regarding disease, pest and stress resistance.

The Germplasm Resources Unit also houses a Pisum collection, all of the elite varieties that are registered in the UK National Listing, and several specialist genetic collections, such as near-isogenic lines, TILLING collections, precise genetic stocks, mapping populations, host differentials for disease testing and variant collections developed and targeted at the research and breeding communities.
