= Arthur E. Watkins =

English botanist (1898–1967)

Arthur Ernest Watkins (April 23, 1898 – January 3, 1967) was an English botanist known for his foundational work in plant genetics.

== Life and career ==
Born in London, he was the only child of Arthur Charles and Edith Isabel Watkins. He was educated at the fee-paying Latymer Upper School and later won a scholarship to study Mathematics and Natural Sciences at St. John’s College, Cambridge. His studies were interrupted by World War I, during which he served with the Royal Field Artillery and later as an Assistant Agricultural Officer in France.

After the war, Watkins resumed his education and graduated from Cambridge in 1920, earning a Diploma in Agriculture in 1922. In 1923, he married Amy Marjorie Blanch, with whom he had a son, John Halse Watkins. Amy died in 1941, and John was killed during the D-Day landings in 1944.

Watkins' professional career was largely spent at Cambridge. He joined the Plant Breeding Institute in 1924 and was appointed as a lecturer in Cytology at the University of Cambridge’s Faculty of Agriculture in 1931. He retired in 1948 and died on January 3, 1967.

== Scientific career ==
Watkins made significant contributions to the field of plant genetics, particularly in understanding the genetics of wheat. He was the first scientist to determine the number of chromosomes in wheat and recognized the importance of preserving genetic diversity in crops. His work in assembling a diverse collection of wheat landraces, known as the Watkins Landrace Wheat Collection, was instrumental in preserving genetic material of wheat from around the world.

During the 1920s and 1930s, Watkins collaborated with notable scientists such as Nikolai Vavilov and John Percival. He used his network of wartime connections to help acquiring wheat samples from remote regions and local markets across the British Empire. Despite numerous challenges, including receiving incorrect samples, Watkins managed to amass over 1,000 lines of bread wheat and many more of durum wheat. His efforts to maintain and regenerate the collection ensured its viability for future research.

Watkins also authored several important books and papers, including "The Origin of Cultivated Plants," "Heredity and Evolution," and "The Wheat Species; a Critique." His research primarily focused on the anatomical traits of wheat, such as awnedness and glume shape, and their taxonomic significance.

== Legacy ==
The Watkins Landrace Wheat Collection is housed at the John Innes Centre’s Germplasm Resource Unit in Norwich and is a vital resource for crop science. The collection continues to provide valuable insights into the genetics and improvement of wheat. This encompassing 827 distinct landraces, has been the focus of extensive research efforts to understand and utilise the genetic diversity of wheat. As of 2024, all landraces in the collection have had their DNA structure sequenced.

Research from the collection could be vital to growing new strains of wheat more resistant to the effects of climate change, as well as potential genetic resistance to aphids and wheat bulb fly, eyespot resistance, tan spot, Stagonospora nodorum blotch (SNB) and Fusarium head blight.
