= Great Kneighton =

Coordinates: 52.166°N 0.111°E

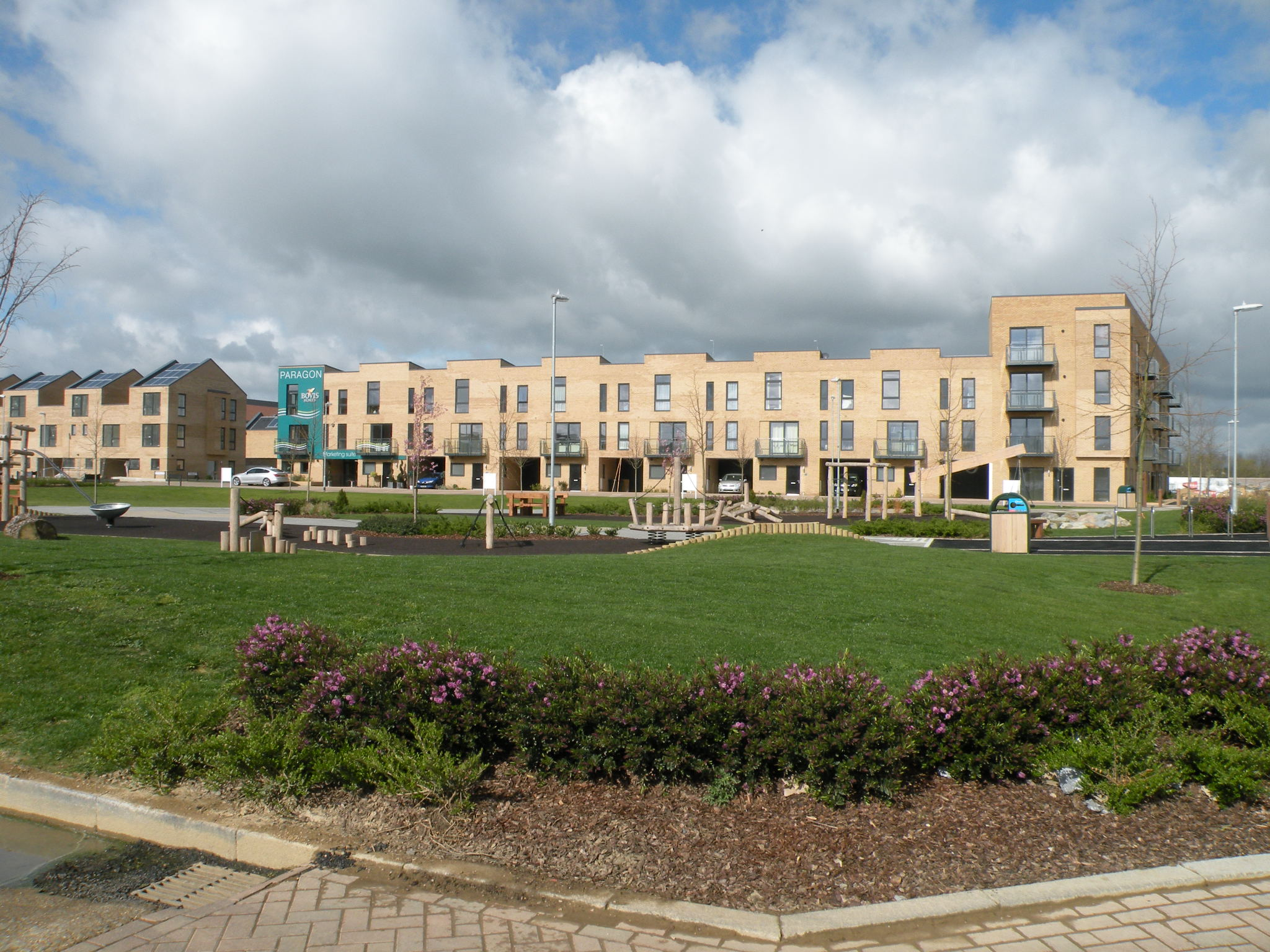
Part of Great Kneighton in 2014

Great Kneighton is a large housing development and residential area in the southern part of the City of Cambridge district of Cambridgeshire, adjacent to, and integrated with, the neighbouring village of Trumpington. Together with nearby development Trumpington Meadows, it forms part of the southern fringe expansion of the city. Currently nearing completion by developers Countryside Properties, it will ultimately consist of almost 2,300 homes.

== Toponymy ==
The development is named after a now-lost area of land named Great Kneighton attested since the 13th century. The name appears to have been assigned to an area of countryside somewhat to the east of the new settlement, within the former Trumpington parish on the site of what is now Addenbrooke's Hospital and the Cambridge Biomedical Campus.

The name of historical Great Kneighton (together with its also-lost counterpart Little Kneighton immediately to its north) is a continuation of the 13th century name Kinetun, which is thought to stem from Old English cyne tun (“king's/royal manor”) although there is no evidence of such a manor on the site.

== Development Plans ==
280 new homes are being built on the Glebe Farm site, south of Shelford Road. These are mainly apartments. Forty per cent of the homes will be "affordable homes", a mixture of rental and intermediate housing, provided by Cambridgeshire Partnerships Limited. The first residents arrived in late 2012. North of Shelford Road, on the Clay Farm site, 2300 homes are to be built, along with a new secondary school, Trumpington Community College (opened in 2015), allotments, and a 120-acre country park. A new neighbourhood centre for Trumpington as a whole will host library provision, community facilities, medical facilities, retail space, youth facilities, as well as office space for the police and social services. Again forty per cent of the homes will be "affordable homes".

As well as providing the allotments, an adventure playground and sports facilities for the planned secondary school, the new park will provide the local community with extensive woodlands, a bird reserve, areas of wetland with balancing ponds and sustainable urban drainage systems, used for harvesting rainwater. All will contribute to the site's biodiversity. Planting has started on the southern half of the Country Park and will include over 13,000 new trees and bushes.

The development's environmentally-friendly credentials extend to encouraging greener modes of transport too, as well as protecting and enhancing the existing natural habitat. It offers easily accessible cycle stores, cycleways and footpaths. There are good public transport links provided by the Guided Busway which provides services to Addenbrooke's and, with a detour via the hospital, to the railway station, city centre and St. Ives.

== Geography ==
Great Kneighton is due south of Cambridge's city centre. Trumpington village proper is immediately to the west, Cambridge Biomedical Campus to the east, beyond the West Anglia Main Line which runs along the eastern edge of the development, with the adjacent village of Great Shelford in the neighbouring South Cambridgeshire district to the south.

The development comprises two sub-developments. Clay Farm is the larger of the two, consisting of all the development from Long Road in the north through to Shelford Road in the south. The major aforementioned amenities in the area, Trumpington Community College and Trumpington Park Primary School, as well as the development's centre, Hobson's Square, are all found within the Clay Farm area. Glebe Farm, the second sub-development, is the smaller of the two and skirts the southern area of Trumpington from Shelford Road in the east to Hauxton Road in the west.

Hobson's Brook, constructed in 1614 to provide drinking water to the growing city of Cambridge, travels through the development separating the residential area from the country park, named Hobson's Park after the waterway. The conduit also gives its name to Hobson's Square, the main square of the development which is currently under construction, as well as two roads in Great Kneighton: Hobson Road and Hobson Avenue.

The nearest access to the rail network is currently Cambridge railway station, however there are proposals for a Cambridge South railway station which would serve the southern areas of the city, including Great Kneighton, as well as the Biomedical Campus and nearby Cherry Hinton.

== Archaeology ==
Prior to the commencement of construction, Oxford Archaeology East undertook archaeological excavations. The 20-hectare (49-acre) site represented the largest single archaeological excavation ever to have been undertaken in the Cambridge area. The team found evidence of activity from the Early Neolithic (c. 4000BC) up to the present, with the bulk of the archaeology dating from the Middle Bronze Age to and Late Iron Age-Early Roman periods. Initially laid out around 1500 BC, the system of middle Bronze Age rectilinear fields and enclosures covered more than half the excavation area, though there was a noticeable absence at the centre of the site. The enclosures may have been for cattle which would have been a valuable resource that needed to be retained and protected from wild animals and rustlers. The enclosures were about 60–90 m x 50 m, bounded by large deep ditches.

The large and highly significant finds assemblage included large quantities of shell-tempered Deverel-Rimbury pottery, flint-tempered finewares, animal bone, bone needles, a bronze spearhead, flint arrowheads, land large numbers of heated sandstones. The form of the late Iron Age occupation was very different – small fields and paddocks bounded by shallower and narrower ditches. No posthole structures were recorded, but the quantity of artefacts indicated direct occupation in parts. In the Late Iron Age, there was a high-status burial near the western edge of the development, close to the present Cambridge Professional Development Centre site. This has been dated to c. 35-40AD and included two bodies which had been cremated. They were accompanied by grave goods from overseas, including pottery vessels and a fine toiletry set.

The settlement continued into the early Roman period before the area was abandoned, probably before the end of the 2nd century. However, one of the most puzzling features on the site, a double ditched sub-circular ‘monument’, partially lying beyond the southwest edge of excavation, dated from a later period. The remains of at least three individuals, five late Roman bracelets and a group of large iron nails, with butchered cattle remains interspersed, were recovered from high up in the inner ditch, suggesting a funerary function for the feature. Some abraded late Roman pottery was also recovered. The human remains appear to have been redeposited, perhaps from a nearby cemetery, in the very late or even post-Roman period.

== Controversy ==
The choice of the name Great Kneighton has provoked controversy among some local organisations and resident groups of neighbouring Trumpington. Historically, the name had been used for an area of the former Trumpington parish somewhat further to the east, now within the grounds of Addenbrooke's Hospital, and these groups voiced disappointment that they had not been consulted prior to the unveiling of the name by Countryside, believing it to be inappropriate. Countryside defended the choice of name by stating that only part of the development is in Trumpington, that the name avoids confusion with other nearby developments, and that the name is appropriate given these circumstances.
