= Adhwal =

Village in Punjab, Pakistan

Coordinates: 33°20′N 72°55′E

Adhwal is a village located at Adyala road near Rawalpindi, in the Punjab, Pakistan. It is also spelt as Adhwal and Adhwaal. It is located in the Pothohar Plateau near the Soan River.

The first census after the Partition of India in 1952 lists Adhwal in Fatehjang Tehsil in Campbellpur District in Rawalpindi Division. With an area of 3 square miles, it then had a population of 1,310 with 710 houses.

It is currently a Qanungo Circle in Rawalpindi Tehsil, and it falls under National Assembly Constituency NA-59 (Rawalpindi-III).

== History ==
Prior to the Partition of India, Adhwal was a village in Campbellpore district (now known as Attock). It was inhabited by Sikhs, Hindus and Muslims and it was one of the villages where the army was called in to control riots. Troops also fired to disperse crowds assembling in Adhwal to attack. It is one of the villages where rioting mobs burnt a large part of the village in March 1947. Gold was discovered near the village, but the village economy is still largely agricultural.

== Language ==
Languages spoken in the village include Punjabi, Potohari and Urdu.

== Source of income ==
This area is mainly agricultural. Wheat and barley were the staple crops being produced in this village, though in recent years, the trend has shifted to more wheat production.

== Dress ==
The dress usually worn is Shalwar kameez, which is also the national dress.

== Famous People ==
Adhwal was the birthplace of Giani Gurmukh Singh Musafir, who later became the Chief Minister of Indian Punjab. Following Partition of India, Musafir had migrated to India along with his family members. He studied at the Adhwal Primary School and completed his schooling from Rawalpindi. Musafir was a recipient of India's second highest civilian honour, the Padma Vibhushan. Scientist Virender Lal Chopra who also headed the Indian Council of Agricultural Research was also born in this village. He was recipient of India's third highest civilian honour, the Padma Bhushan. Adhwal(Hadwal) is also the birth place of shri Buta Singh (1873–1943) who spearheaded the spiritual organization now spread all over the world under registered tag of "Sant Nirankari Mission"
