= Frank Engledow =

British agricultural botanist (1890–1985)

Sir Frank Leonard Engledow CMG FRS (20 August 1890 – 3 July 1985) was a British agricultural botanist who carried out research at the Plant Breeding Institute at the University of Cambridge from 1919 onwards. He was a fellow of St John's College (1919–1985), Cambridge, and held the positions of University Lecturer in Agriculture (1926–1930) and Drapers Professor of Agriculture (1930–1957) at Cambridge, where he directed the School of Agriculture from 1930 to 1957. Engledow advised the British government on agricultural production in the (former) colonies as well as in the homeland from 1927 to 1962. He continued to publish on agricultural practices and teaching after his retirement.

== Education ==
Engledow was born in Deptford, Kent, the fifth and youngest child of Henry Engledow, a police sergeant and, after his retirement, agent of Bexleyheath Brewery and Elizabeth Prentice. Frank was educated at Dartford Grammar School, from where he went to University College London to study pure and applied mathematics and physics on a one-year scholarship. He won College Prizes in these subjects and obtained a year later a BSc externally. He was then admitted to St John's College, Cambridge, where he was more interested in the application of mathematics than in the theory which he was supposed to be studying. He was, however, allowed to change to study botany, zoology and geology and earned a First in Part I of the Natural Sciences Tripos in 1912, the award of a Slater Studentship of the College and, later, a Research Scholarship of the Ministry of Agriculture.

He had been accepted as assistant by R.H. Biffen, who had been appointed in 1908 as the first Professor of Agricultural Botany and became the first Director of the newly founded Plant Breeding Institute in 1912. A programme of research combining genetics with quantitative methods and statistics was launched resulting in three papers by Engledow in 1914. One of these was co-authored by G. Udny Yule (then Lecturer in Statistics in Cambridge), who became very interested in the statistics to be used in agricultural botany. Engledow became a Fellow of St John's, submitting his thesis in 1919 based on his experimental work.

== World War I ==
Engledow enlisted in The Queen's Own Royal West Kent Regiment shortly before the war. From 1915 to 1919 the Regiment served in India and Mesopotamia and Engledow rose to the rank of Lieutenant-Colonel. He was stationed in Jhanai, where he was also in hospital with typhoid, and at regimental headquarters in Rawalpindi. Late in 1917 he spent a number of months as assistant to the Director of Agriculture of Mesopotamia. He was decorated with a Croix de Guerre in 1918.

During his overseas service he made notes on the agricultural practices he saw. After the war he returned to the School of Agriculture and the Plant Breeding Institute to resume his research.

== The Plant Breeding Institute ==
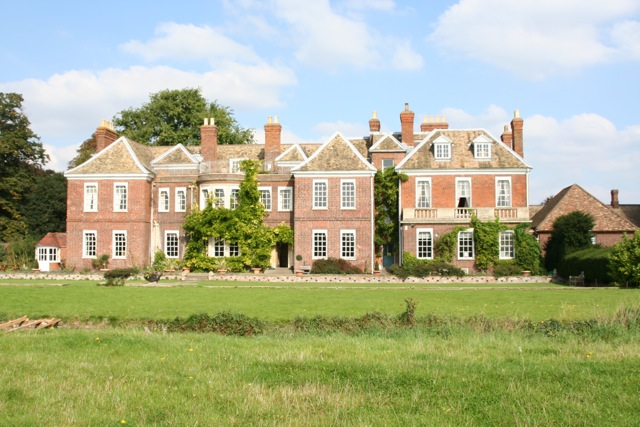
Anstey Hall-Former headquarters of Plant Breeding Institute (from 1955)

The Institute was a rather modest facility and the work very labour-intensive. Nevertheless, fruitful research was done on breeding wheat and barley. Biffen's discovery that characteristics such as resistance to disease and grain quality were inheritable was the basis by which Engledow, by introducing quantitative analysis and statistics, was able to improve these crops. Seven consecutive papers on wheat were published between 1923 and 1930 in the Journal of Agricultural Science of Cambridge and with G. Udney Yule he published a seminal paper on yield trials in 1926. These papers were innovative with regard to breeding of cereals and other commodities, linking the roles of geneticists, plant breeders and field experimentalists. Engledows breeding activities resulted in new varieties of wheat by selection (Rampton Rivet cultivated 1939–57, Squareheads Master 13/4, 1940–60), and by hybridisation (Holdfast, 1936–58 and Steadfast, 1941–53).

In 1921 he married Mildred Emmeline Roper, a graduate botany student from Cape Town, South Africa. She gave up her academic activity to become his wife and expert adviser on a daily basis. In 1924 they made a tour through Canada and the USA for seven weeks, visiting various agricultural areas and a scientific meeting, to become better acquainted with the agricultural practices of that continent.

== Drapers Professorship ==
In 1930 Engledow was appointed to the Drapers chair of Agriculture in 1930, having been Lecturer in Agriculture from 1926. Once he became Professor the School of Agriculture was extended. The Plant Breeding Institute was enlarged from 250 to 450 acres, more research laboratories were installed and advisory services were begun. Engledow was active in developing and planning further changes in the School and its curriculum to reflect the changing role of agricultural science in improving food production worldwide.

During World War II he served in the Home Guard and the Ministry of Agriculture, helping food production. He was also a member of the Agricultural Research Council (ARC) of England and Wales and the Agricultural Improvement Council (AIC). These activities culminated in him attending the United Nations conference on Food and Agriculture in 1943 in Hot Springs, VA, USA as a deputy of the Ministry. Back home he wrote a policy Memorandum for England and Wales based on a recommendation of the UN Conference. The report was approved by ARC and AIC and was to serve as the foundation for agricultural policy in the UK.

In 1943 he was appointed as a Managing Trustee of the newly established Nuffield Foundation, retiring in 1966. He was, as Chairman of a special committee responsible for the study and the publication of "Principles for British Agricultural Policy" that had been initiated in 1945 and was completed in the late fifties. He became a Knight Bachelor in 1944 and was elected a Fellow of the Royal Society in 1946.

His plans for the School of Agriculture, formulated in 1939, were to be put in practice after the war when both the research institutes and the advisory service were taken up in nationwide organisations. Well aware of the changing expectations in the post-war world of the role of agricultural science and of the alumni of the School, he was concerned with the balance between specialisation and breadth, as his papers of 1968 and 1970 show. Direct contact with farming practices and their consequences for the environment in the long-term were the responsibility of his graduates, he maintained.

== Travelling and advising ==
Engledow undertook a long series of overseas travels with the aim of advising either local parties or governmental bodies or part of the British government:

- 1927 to the Gold Coast, Ghana and especially Nigeria for the Empire Cotton Growing Corporation, 9 weeks Report on cotton growing and seed supply in Nigeria (with C.N.French)
- 1929 to Trinidad, to inspect the Cotton Research Institute and to report on the teaching and research of the Imperial College of Tropical Agriculture on behalf of the Empire Marketing Board, 9 weeks Confidential report
- 1933 Chairman of a Commission of Inquiry into the affairs of the Rubber Research Institute, Malaya (Kuala Lumpur) at the request of the Secretary of State for the Colonies, 14 weeks; Report to the Ministry
- 1935-36 Chairman of the Commission of Inquiry on the Scientific Development of the Indian Tea Association on behalf of that Organisation. They made a tour of 4 months (long distance by ship) to tea growing areas in Ceylon, North India (Assam), Central India (briefly) and (by plane) Java and Sumatra (Dutch colony). Report to the Indian Tea Association
- 1938-39 Member of the Royal Commission on the West Indies (‘Moyne Commission’), which toured, on the Yacht of Lord Moyne from New York, all the British West Indian Colonies for 4.5 months to report on the social and economic conditions of the West Indies. The report was handed over to the Government to act upon it, although the report was only published after the war. On some matters it was then decided that the report merited updating with a view to eventual decolonisation
- 1945 Report on Agriculture, Fisheries, Forestry and Veterinary Matters, by F.L. Engledow Esq. C.M.G., Supplement to the Report of the West India Royal Commission; The report of the Commission is available from H.M.S.O. as #6608.
- 1946 Delegate, with H.A Temperley and J.W. Monroe of a Committee to the Colonial Office to select a site for an Agricultural Research Institute to implement Agricultural, Animal Health and Forestry Research in Kenya, Uganda, Tanganyika and Zanzibar. After two months Engledow visited Sudan on the way back . Report: Agriculture in the Colonies. 1. Agricultural issues facing Colonial peoples. 2. Agricultural Betterment in East Africa. Colonial Office.
- 1948 During a travel of 5 months, he visited Rhodesia with his wife at the request of the Southern Rhodesian Government to report on Policy on Agricultural Development, and for research, education and advisory work connected to such a policy; Reports: Agricultural Production in the early future: second interim report of Southern Rhodesia Development Co-ordinating Commission. Salisbury, Southern Rhodesia Government Stationery Office; Report on agricultural teaching, research and advisory work. Salisbury S. Rhodesia Government Stationery Office; Report to the Minister of Agriculture and Lands on the agricultural development of Southern Rhodesia, Salisbury, Government Stationery Office, 1950.
- 1952-53 Sir Frank and his wife travelled for seven weeks (mostly by plane) in Africa as a member of an advisory committee of the Colonial Office and for the Empire Cotton Growing Corporation. They visited Sudan, Kenia, Uganda, Tangayika and Zanzibar. They visited also Khartoum to meet Joseph Hutchinson, who became later his successor.
- 1953-54 A four-week journey to Assam as Chairman of a Commission of the Indian Tea Association. Report on tea growing problems and current research to the Indian Tea Association.
- 1954-55 Visit of 7.5 weeks of Trinidad (Imperial College of Tropical Agriculture, of the Board of which he was first a member for several years and, later, Chairman), Tobago, Barbados and Jamaica were also visited (by ship).
- 1956-57 A 4.5 wks journey to Kenia and Uganda on request of the Governing Body of the East African Tea Research Institute in Kericho, Kenia. Report: on the Tea Research Institute of East Africa.
- 1957 At the request of the Federal Government of Nyasaland and Rhodesia, Sir Frank travelled for 4.5 months (by ship from and to the UK) to report on Agricultural Policy and Development. He was present at the 7th Degree Day of Gwebi College of Agriculture which was founded after the advice of the Miles Thomas Development Commission of Southern Rhodesia of which he was vice-chairman in 1948.
- 1959 Invited to give Foundation Oration of Kumasi College of Technology (Ghana) and for lecturing (6 weeks) and to Nigeria at request of Nigerian Government to report on a Federal Scheme of Agricultural Research (4 weeks)
- 1959-60 A one-month tour to Uganda, Tanganyika and Kenia visiting agricultural organisations
- 1961 Visited Malaya on behalf of Rubber Research Institute of Malaya as a member of the Co-ordinating Advisory Committee on Rubber to that country and on the way out visited Assam for tea growing research (7 weeks).
- 1962 A further 6 weeks in Malaya, presumably in consequence of the tour of 1961.

== Personal life ==
Engledow married in 1921 Mildred Emmeline Roper (Cape Town, 1896–1956, Cambridge). They had four daughters, Margareth Elizabeth (1922–1974), Catherine Mary (1924–1984), Ruth Mildred (1928-2017) and Audrey Rachel (1933–2002). They lived from 1931 onwards on Huntingdon Road next to Howe Farm, a part of Cambridge University Farm (which also included the Plant Breeding Institute) in a newly built house called Hadleigh.

== Honours ==
1918 Croix de Guerre
1935 Companion of the Order of St Michael and St George
1944 Knight Bachelor
1946 Fellowship of the Royal Society
1948–49 Member of Council of the Royal Society
1957 Emeritus Professor of Agriculture of Cambridge

== Selected papers ==
- (with G. Udny Yule) The determination of the best value of the coupling ratio from a given set of data. Proc.Camb. phil . Soc. 17, 436; 1914.
- The inheritance of glume-length and grain-length in a wheat cross. J. Genet.10, 93; 1920.
- (with J. P. Shelton) An investigation upon certain metrical attributes of wheat plants. J. agr. Sci. Camb. 12, 197;1922.
- (with J. B. Hutchinson) Inheritance in wheat, II T.turgidum x T. durum crosses, with notes on the inheritance of solidness in straw. J. Genet. 16, 19;1925.
- A census of an acre of corn. J. agr. Sci. Camb.16, 166; 1926.
- (with G. Udny Yule) The principles and practice of yield trials I and II. Emp. Cott. Grow. Rev. 3, 112, 335; 1926.
- Plant breeding: its practices and scientific evolution. Scient. Jl. R. Coll. Sci.1. 74;1930.
- Quality in food from the agricultural point of view. Chemy. Ind., Lond. 56, 459;1937 as well as Trop agric. Trin. 89, 240;1937.
- The place of plant physiology and of plant breeding in the advancement of British agriculture. Rep. Brit. Ass. Sect. M. Cambridge. Reproduced in Emp.J. exp. Agric. 7, 145; 1939.
- Agricultural development in the British Colonial Empire. J. Proc. Agric. Econ. Soc.. 7, 145; 1947.
- ‘Rowland Harry Biffen, 1874–1949', Obituary Notices of Fellows of the Royal Society, 7, 9–25 1950
- Agricultural teaching in Cambridge. Mem. Camb. Univ. Sch. Agric. 28, 5; 1956.
- Agricultural progress. Foundation Oration. Kumasi College of Technology. 1959.
- Africa’s greatest problem: -food. Progress, Lond (265), 250; 1960.
- (with H. T. Williams) Principles for British agricultural policy. Nuffield Foundation. Oxford Univ. Press. 1960.
- Teaching and research in botany in the United Kingdom. Nature, Lond., 220, 541, 1968.
- Botany in the United Kingdom – needs and potentialities. Advmt. Sci. Lond.,26, 408;1970.
- Book (with L. Amey) : Britain’s future in farming (studies in land economy). Berkhamsted: Geographical publications. 1980.
