= Thomas Middleton (agriculturalist) =

British agriculturalist (1863–1943)

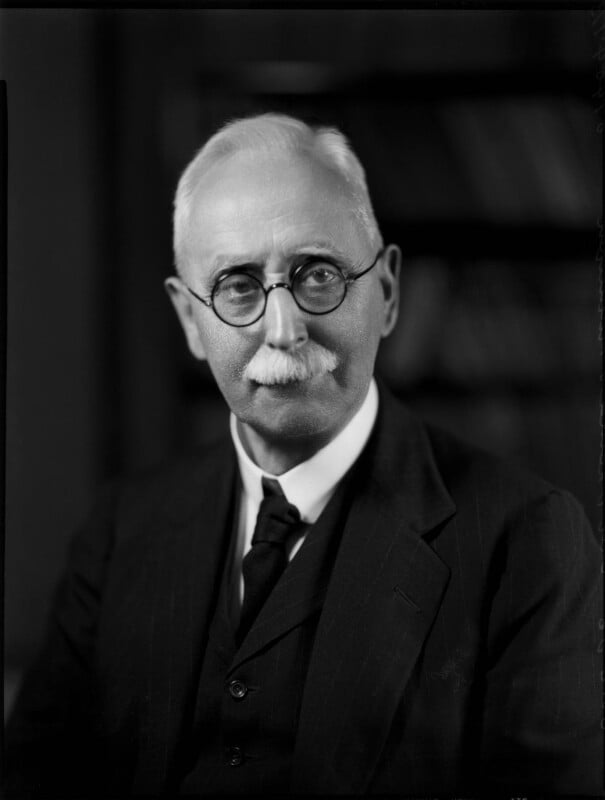
Middleton in 1936

Sir Thomas Hudson Middleton KCIE KBE CB FRS (1863–14 May 1943) was a British biologist.

He was a Professor of Agriculture at the Durham College of Science, when in January 1902 he was elected Professor of Agriculture at the University of Cambridge. Five months later, he received the honorary degree Master of Arts (MA) from the university at a congregation in June 1902. He was later chairman of the Agricultural Research Council.
