= Harold W. Howard =

Dr. Harold Wakefield Howard OBE (25 March 1913 - 1 January 1985) was a botanist, best known for breeding the Maris Piper potato variety, which was the first potato variety to be resistant to potato cyst nematodes.

Dr. Howard’s research at the Plant Breeding Institute, Cambridge to develop a variety of potatoes resistant to the potato cyst nematodes was a significant scientific achievement, as this pest caused losses estimated at £30M annually, for this work he was awarded an OBE in 1976. The Maris Piper potato variety is still the most popular potato variety in the UK. Howard also wrote a book on potato genetics "Genetics of the Potato: Solanum Tuberosum".
