= Maris Wigeon =

Variety of wheat

Maris Wigeon is a heritage variety of wheat that has traditionally been used for thatching in the UK. This variety was developed in 1964 by the Plant Breeding Institute in Cambridgeshire. The 'Maris' in the name, was derived from Maris Lane, the address of PBI headquarters in Trumpington, Cambridge.

== Uses ==
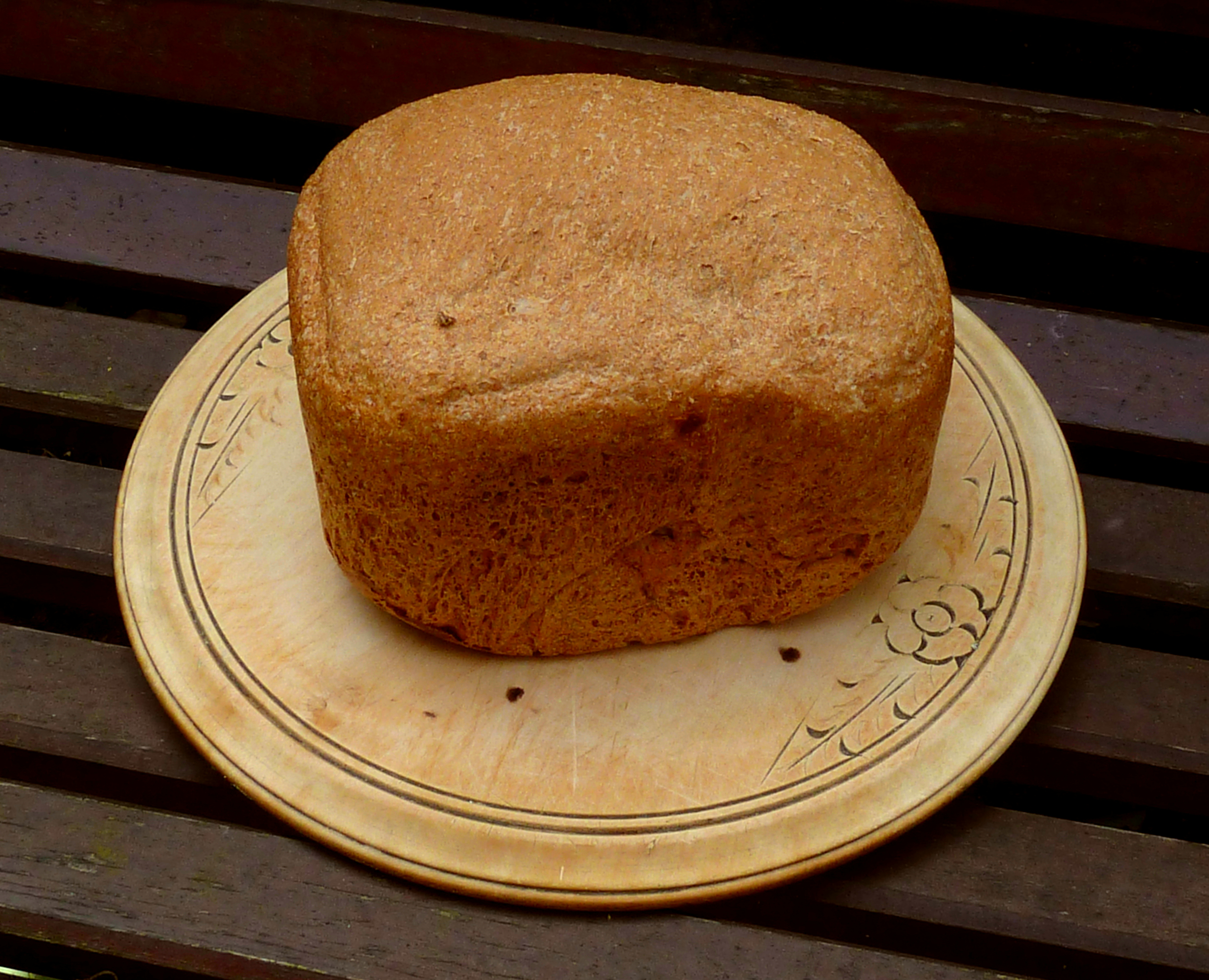
Bread made with maris wigeon flour

It produces a tall, strong stemmed straw without the use of artificial fertilisers, which makes it popular with thatchers and straw craftsmen. It is also popular with artisan bread bakers and specialist organic millers.

== Problems in production ==
There are two wheat varieties, suitable for thatching, on the current National List of Permitted Varieties (EU legislation policed by DEFRA) - Maris Widgeon and Maris Huntsman. Until 2008/9 the only commercial seed distributor for Maris Widgeon was Pickards Seeds, of Burrington, Devon. Other traditional varieties have become unlisted which means that they cannot be bought, sold or even given away. At one time, no option existed but to grow Maris Widgeon from kept seed.

Maris Widgeon is currently commercially available from various outlets, such as Pearce Seeds of Yeovil, Somerset, for commercial or organic farming. Pearce Seeds are responsible for 'maintaining and protecting' the Maris Widgeon heritage variety of wheat.
