= Drapers Professor of Agriculture =

Named UK university chair

Drapers Professor of Agriculture was a professorship at the University of Cambridge. County councils in England petitioned the university to offer agricultural education in the 1880s, but it argued against doing so as it was deemed incompatible with an academic education. The colleges of the university were major landowners however and this led to the university accepting an endowment from the Worshipful Company of Drapers in 1899.

The following people held the post:

- Sir Thomas Hudson Middleton 1902-1907.
- Thomas Barlow Wood 1907-1929.
- Sir Frank Engledow 1930-1957.
- Sir Joseph Hutchinson 1957-1969.
- Sir James Beament 1969-1989.
