= Joseph Hutchinson =

British biologist

Joseph Burtt Hutchinson
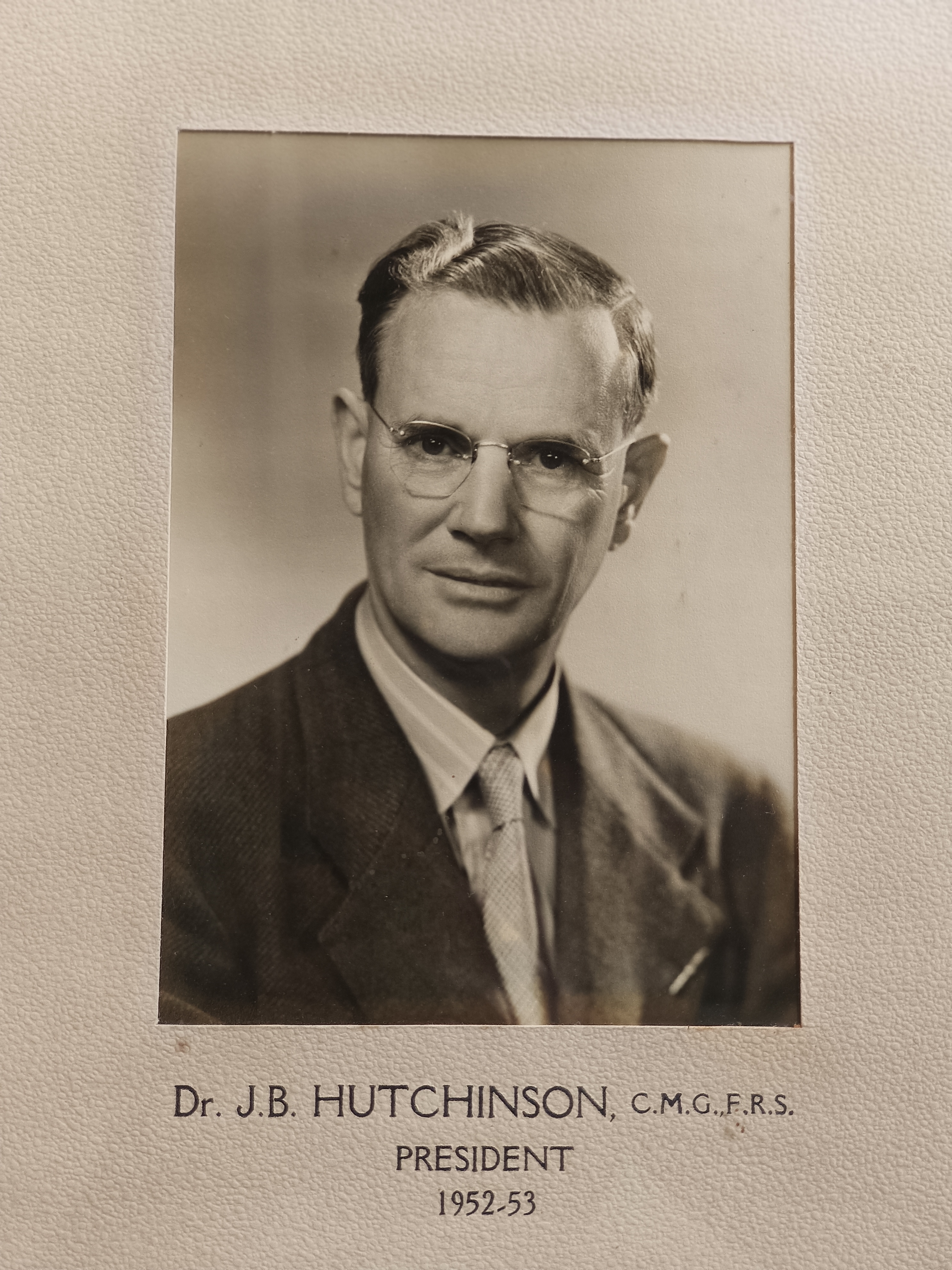
- Born: 21 March 1902; UK
- Died: 16 January 1988 (aged 85); UK
- Citizenship: British
- Awards: Royal Medal (1967); Fellow of the Royal Society
- Scientific career
- Fields: Biology

Sir Joseph Burtt Hutchinson FRS (21 March 1902 – 16 January 1988) was a British biologist. He was Drapers Professor of Agriculture at the University of Cambridge from 1957 to 1969.

He served as the president of The Uganda Society between 1952 and 1953

== Biography ==
He was educated at Bootham School, York and at St John's College, Cambridge. He was elected a Fellow of the Royal Society in March 1951 and was awarded their Royal Medal in 1967 "In recognition of his distinguished work on the genetics and evolution of crop-plants with particular reference to cotton."

His FRS candidature citation said that: "His contributions are outstanding among advances culminating in a notably improved and simplified classification of the genus Gossypium on a genetic basis and an admirably developed theory of the evolution of its species. His work is central in the very fine tradition of British workers which, by remarkable theoretical insight, combined with technical skill, has placed Cotton among the best studied of the world's cultivated crops. By his genetical work, coupled with exceptionally wide study of variability of field crops (especially Cotton), in the West Indies, India and Africa, the scientific foundations of the art of practical plant improvement have been substantially strengthened." He was president of The Uganda Society in 1952–1953.

He was knighted in 1956. He presided over the 1966 British Association meeting. He died on 16 January 1988.
