= Trumpington =

Village in Cambridgeshire, England

Coordinates: 52.174°N 0.109°E

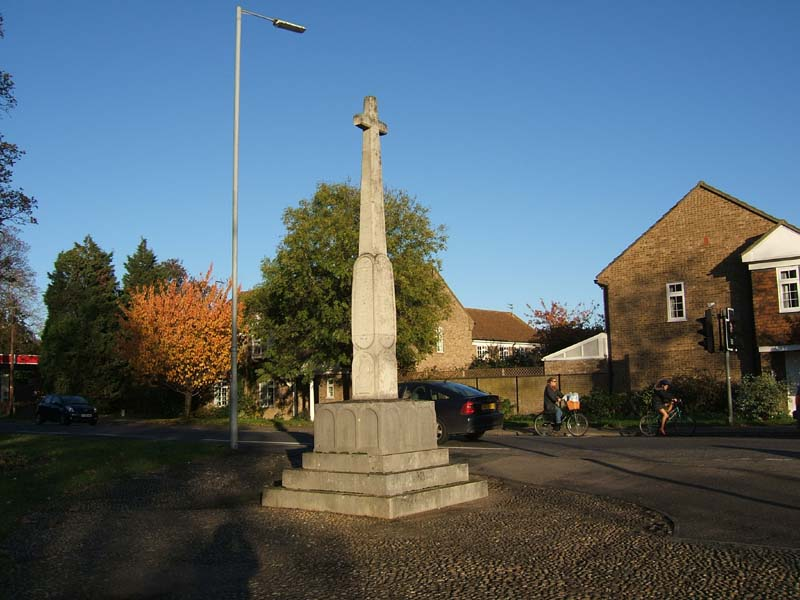
- Trumpington War Memorial

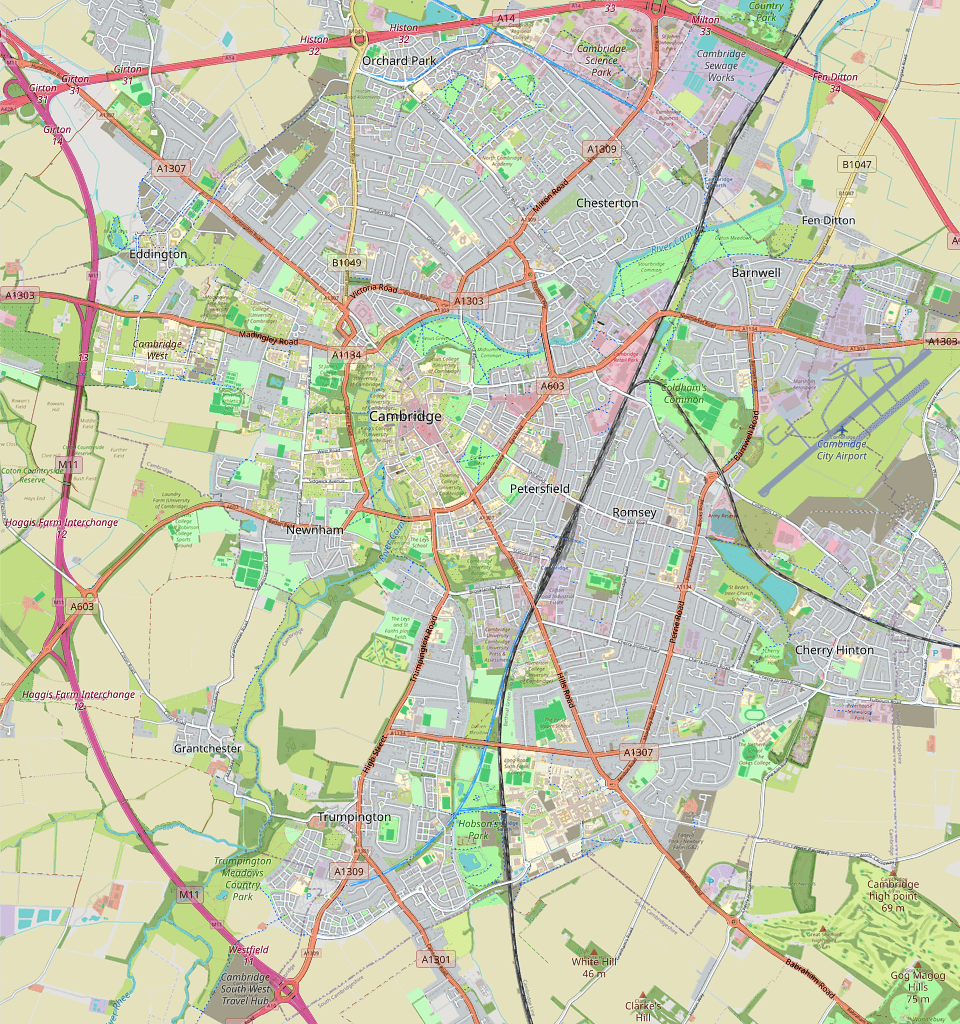
- Location within Cambridgeshire
- Population: 12,393
- OS grid reference: TL442549
- District: Cambridge
- Shire county: Cambridgeshire
- Region: East
- Country: England
- Sovereign state: United Kingdom
- Post town: Cambridge
- Postcode district: CB2
- Dialling code: 01223
- Police: Cambridgeshire
- Fire: Cambridgeshire
- Ambulance: East of England
- UK Parliament: Cambridge

Trumpington is a village in Cambridgeshire, England, mostly located in Cambridge, with a small southern area of the village extending into the South Cambridgeshire district. As of the 2021 UK census, the village had a population of 12,393 people.

The village was a separate parish from the Anglo-Saxon era until the 20th century. In 1912 all of the land north of Long Road was transferred to Cambridge, and on 1 April 1934 most of the remaining land, including all of the village, was also given over to Cambridge. Only 382 acres (155 ha), almost uninhabited, were transferred to Haslingfield parish. In 1931 the parish had a population of 1183.

The Cambridge Local Plan 2006 took land around the village out of the green belt and paved the way for an urban extension due for completion in 2023.

== Archaeology ==
There is evidence of Iron Age and Roman settlements in Trumpington, near the River Cam ford by the road to Grantchester, and a Roman cemetery. An Anglo-Saxon cemetery has also been found nearby at Dam Hill.

=== Trumpington bed burial ===
In 2012 archaeologists working on the Trumpington Meadows site discovered a 7th-century Anglo-Saxon bed burial for a young woman aged about 16 years old, in a field on the outskirts of the village. The occupant of the grave had been buried on a wooden bed, and had an ornate gold pectoral cross inlaid with garnets on her breast. The jewelled gold cross is very unusual, and can only have belonged to a member of a rich aristocratic family. It is thought that the grave must have been associated with a hitherto unknown Anglo-Saxon settlement near the site, perhaps that of a monastic community.

== History ==
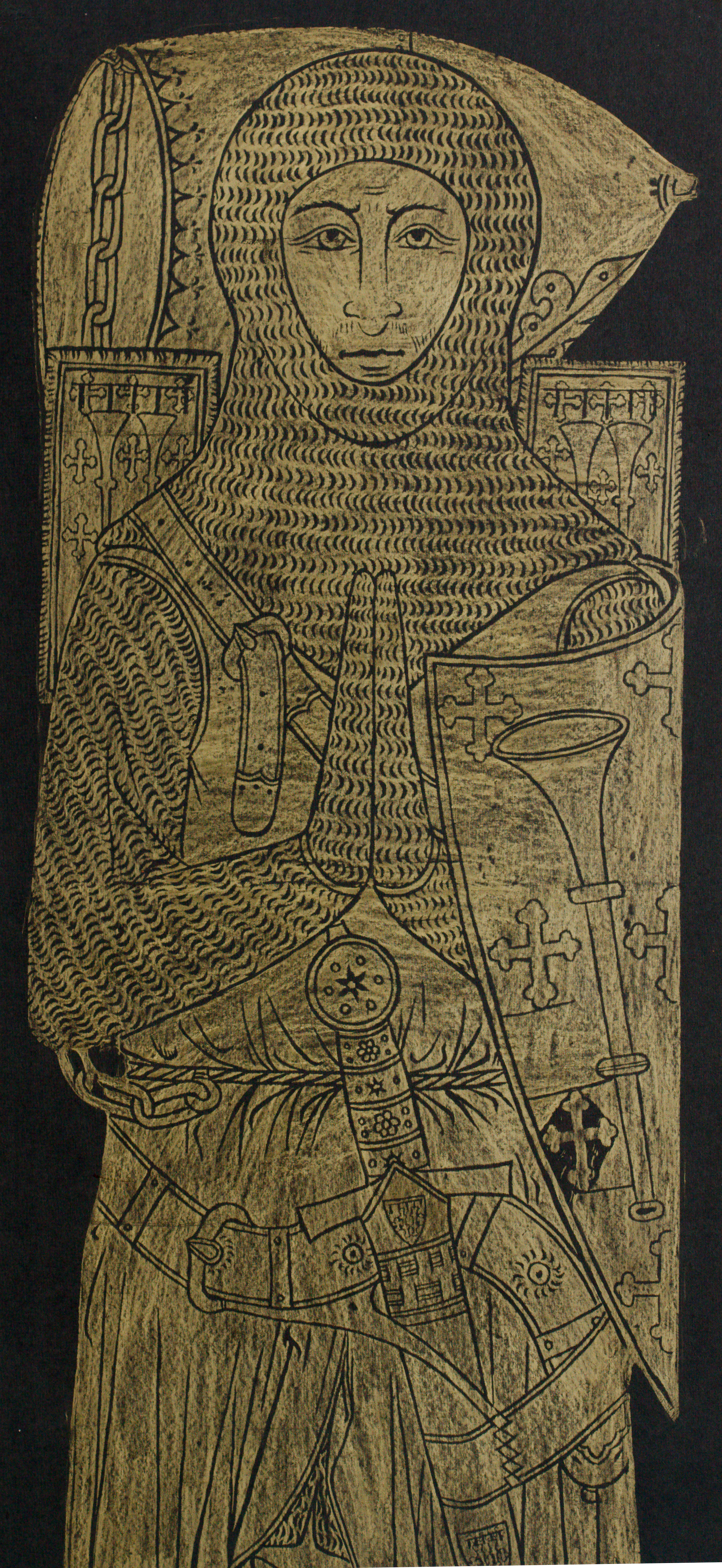
Brass rubbing of the memorial to Sir Roger de Trumpington

The Domesday Book of 1086 records a community of 33 peasants. The population had risen to 100 by the late 13th century. The village remained sizeable throughout the Middle Ages and by 1801 there were 494 residents. By the time the parish was dissolved there were about 1,200 inhabitants. Until the 20th century Trumpington was an agricultural village with cattle and sheep as well as crops.

Trumpington's association with agriculture was extended in 1955, when the Plant Breeding Institute (PBI) – founded in 1912 as part of the University of Cambridge's School of Agriculture – moved to the Anstey Hall site adjoining Maris Lane in Trumpington. Here the PBI developed new plants, notably potatoes called Maris Piper and Maris Peer, a barley called Maris Otter, and a wheat called Maris Widgeon. These are now in use worldwide. The PBI was split up and privatised in 1987. In 1990 the PBI moved to Colney, near Norwich, but the reference to the Maris Lane site survives in the names of plants.

Anstey Hall is a Grade I listed, former country house built c. 1700 within its own parkland. Once owned by writer and poet Christopher Anstey and later by the polymath Robert Leslie Ellis, it was leased to the PBI for many years. It is now used for weddings, parties, corporate events and meetings.

The Trumpington War Memorial was designed and carved by Eric Gill, who also designed and carved the crocodile on the wall of the Cavendish Laboratory. The memorial was dedicated on Sunday 11 December 1921 to commemorate 36 Trumpington men who died in the First World War. The Second World War claimed eight more local men; their names were added by David Kindersley, a pupil of Gill.

=== Trumpington Fair ===
In 1314, the lord of the manor, Giles of Trumpington, was given permission to hold a three-day fair on the feast of St Peter's Chains (1 August). The feast was still held in the 19th century though it was transferred to 28–30 June, and became known for the rowdiness and drunkenness of its many visitors. It was reduced to only one day (29 June) in 1882 and was still held in the 1930s.

=== Railway stations ===
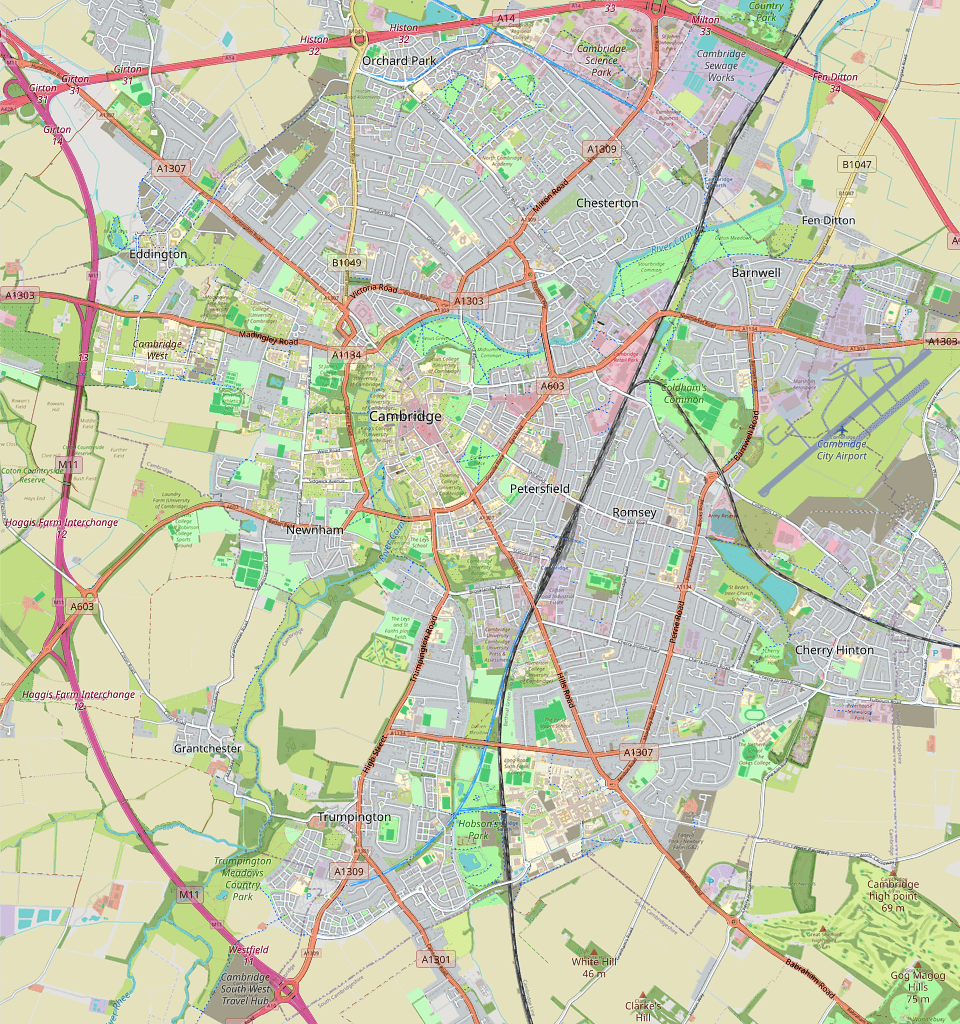
Cambridge railway stations map
(current in bold, closed in italics)

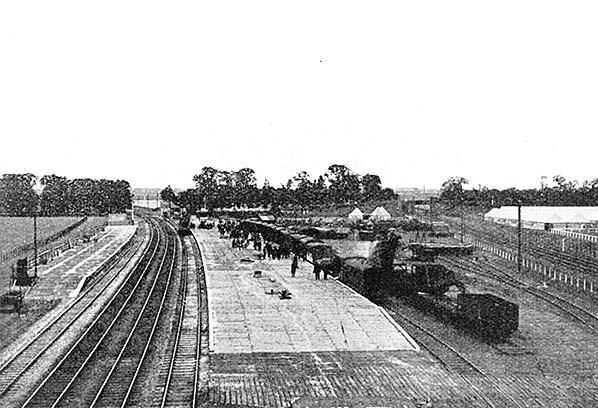
Trumpington station

Trumpington has had two railway stations. The first one was a temporary railway station that operated from 4 to 8 July 1922. It was built to serve the Royal Agricultural Society's show and was demolished after the show had ended.

The second railway station, called Cambridge South, opened on 28 June 2026. It also serves and is mainly located adjacent to the Cambridge Biomedical Campus. From Trumpington, the station is accessed through Hobson's Park.

== Parish church ==
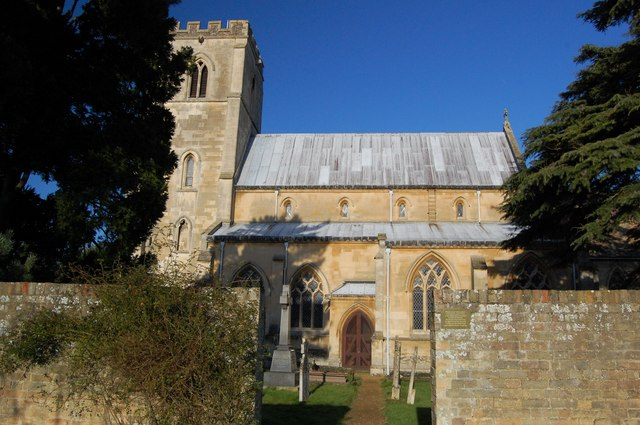
Parish church of SS Mary and Michael

The earliest parts of the Church of England parish church of Saints Mary and Michael are late 12th- or early 13th-century. The chancel was rebuilt late in the 13th century. The rest of the church, including the nave, clerestory, aisles, chapels, porches and upper part of the tower was rebuilt about 1330. The church was restored several times in the 19th century, notably in 1858 and 1876–77 under the direction of the Gothic Revival architect William Butterfield. The church is a Grade I listed building.

The church is the resting place of Henry Fawcett, the blind academic and politician who, as Postmaster General (1880–84), introduced parcel post, postal orders and other innovations. The local primary school is named Fawcett School after him. John Venn, originator of the Venn diagram, is buried in the church's extension graveyard, at the junction of Shelford Road and Hauxton Road.

The church also contains the monumental brass of Sir Roger de Trumpington, a crusader knight bearing the date 1289; it is said to be the second oldest brass in England. The brass of Sir Roger as seen through the thoughtful eyes of a young Royal Air Force Spitfire pilot who visited the church in 1941 is movingly described by Squadron Leader Guy Mayfield, then chaplain of RAF Station Duxford, in his diary. It is noted by Anthony Sattin that T. E. Lawrence hung a rubbing of the brass in 'pride of place' in his parents' Oxford home.

The west tower has a ring of eight bells, all cast and hung in 1957 by John Taylor & Co of Loughborough. The church has also a sanctus bell cast at Bury St Edmunds in about 1450.

== "Southern Fringe" developments ==
Cambridge City Council's 2006 Local Plan provided for the release of an extensive area of Green Belt land around Trumpington for new housing and associated community facilities. Major new developments are being constructed on the Glebe Farm and Clay Farm sites to the south and east of the village, and on Trumpington Meadows to the southwest.

In 2017 a new civil parish of South Trumpington was created, which will include some of the most southerly part of the new Trumpington Meadows development. It comprises the land formerly in the Haslingfield parish of South Cambridgeshire that lies east of the River Cam between the current Cambridge city council boundary and the M11.

== Cultural references ==
- Geoffrey Chaucer's The Reeve's Tale is set in the village, and a water mill on the River Cam is mentioned in it. The location of the mill is believed to be Old Mill Holt on the river to the southwest of the village.
- The 19th-century novelist G. A. Henty, was born in Trumpington.
- Clergyman, classicist, philologist, and Plato translator, Robert Gregg Bury, worked in Trumpington as a vicar in 1903-18 and was Vice President of the Trumpington Volunteer Training Corps during the First World War.
- The former BBC journalist Bridget Kendall, later Master of Peterhouse, grew up in Trumpington and attended Perse School for Girls.
- Pink Floyd's lead singer and guitarist, David Gilmour, lived in Trumpington in his early childhood.
- In the "Matthew Bartholomew" series of novels by Susanna Gregory, Trumpington is the location of the Manor House belonging to Matthew's sister and husband.
- Trumpington residents are referred to in Rupert Brooke 's poem The Old Vicarage, Grantchester, written in 1912 - "...they fling oaths at one, / And worse than oaths at Trumpington."
- Trumpington is mentioned in Jimmy Kimmel sketch about Donald Trump being a time traveler "The Rabbit Hole with Jimmy Kimmel: Is Trump a Time Traveler?", joking that Trumpington Village Hall was financed by Donald Trump in 1908.

== Politics ==
Most of Trumpington falls within the electoral ward of Trumpington on Cambridge City Council, which is represented by three councilors. As of 2026, the three councilors are Olaf Hauk and Nadya Lokhmotova of the Liberal Democrats, and Ingrid Flaubert of the Green Party. Like the rest of Cambridge, the ward is an unparished area. A small southern area of the village is part of the parish of South Trumpington, which falls within the South Cambridgeshire district. For South Cambridgeshire District Council elections, the parish is part of the electoral ward of Harston and Comberton.

== Gallery ==
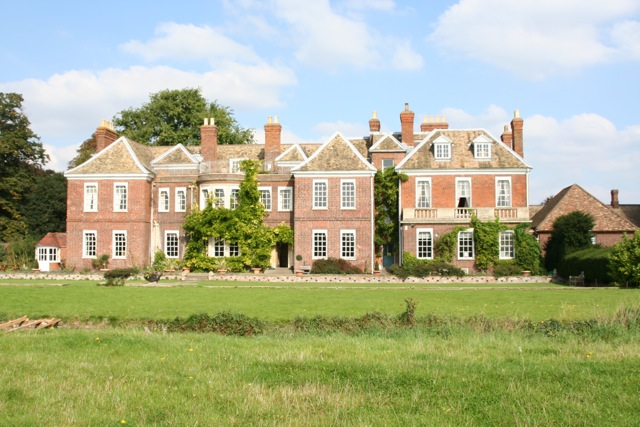
Anstey Hall

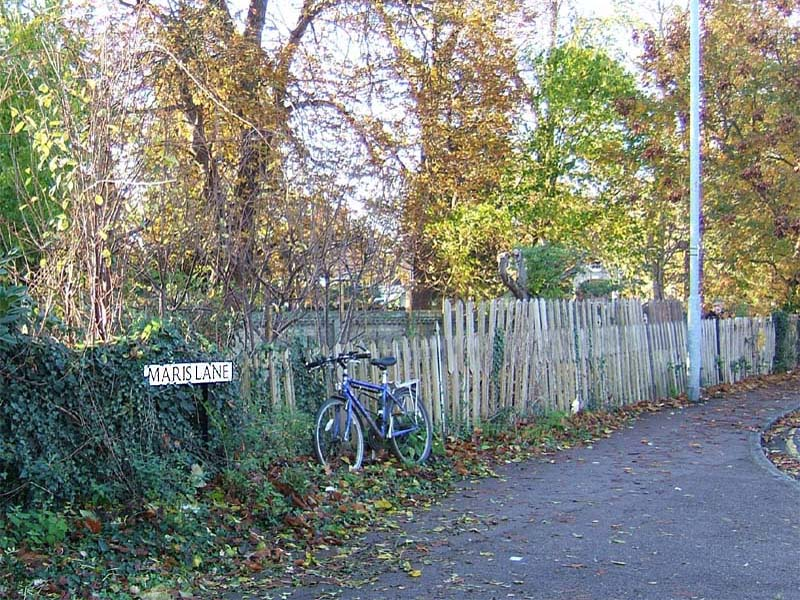
Maris Lane, Trumpington

== Sources and further reading ==
- Pevsner, Nikolaus (1970) [1954]. Cambridgeshire. The Buildings of England. Harmondsworth: Penguin Books. pp. 472–475. ISBN 0-14-071010-8.
- Wright, APM, ed. (1982). A History of the County of Cambridge and the Isle of Ely. Victoria County History. Vol. VIII. London: Institute of Historical Research. pp. 248–267.
