= John Walton Capstick =

Bursar of Trinity College, Cambridge

John Walton Capstick OBE (31 August 1858 – 27 April 1937) was a Bursar of Trinity College, Cambridge.

== Biography ==
Capstick was born in Lancaster, Lancashire and educated at the Friends' School, Lancaster, and Owens College, Manchester. He took a teaching post at the University of Dundee and entered Trinity as a sub-sizar in 1888. He was elected to sizarship in 1889 and to a scholarship in 1890.

He is buried in the Parish of the Ascension Burial Ground in Cambridge, with his wife Edith Capstick.
