= Rowland Biffen =

British botanist (1874–1949)

Sir Rowland Harry Biffen
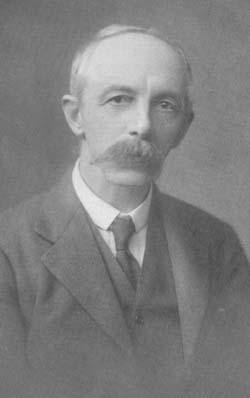
- Born: 28 March 1874; Cheltenham
- Died: 12 July 1949 (aged 75); Cambridge
- Occupations: botanist, mycologist, geneticist and a professor of agricultural botany at the University of Cambridge
- Known for: the founder of the Journal of Agricultural Science.

Sir Rowland Harry Biffen FRS (28 May 1874, in Cheltenham – 12 July 1949) was a British botanist, mycologist, geneticist and a professor of agricultural botany at the University of Cambridge who worked on breeding wheat varieties. He was also a gifted artist known for his landscapes in watercolours. He was the founder of the Journal of Agricultural Science.

== Biography ==
Biffen was the oldest child of Henry John who was headmaster of Christ Church school in Cheltenham, and his wife, Mary. After studying at Cheltenham Grammar School, he graduated from Emmanuel College, Cambridge, in 1898 after being Frank Smart student in botany at Gonville and Caius College. He went on an expedition to the Caribbean and South America to examine rubber production soon after graduation. He then worked as a university demonstrator, researching fungi under Harry Marshall Ward and obtained a patent for the handling of rubber latex. He published a number of papers on mycology between 1898 and 1902 and subsequently became president of the British Mycological Society in 1905 and again in 1930.

In 1908, Biffen was appointed the first professor of agricultural botany at Cambridge, a post he held till 1931. He won the Royal Society's Darwin Medal in 1920. Biffen was the first director of the Plant Breeding Institute, which became part of the John Innes Centre in 1994, and was an early proponent of using genetics to improve crop plants. His primary research plant was wheat. Among the most important wheat varieties he bred were Little Joss (1910. named inadvertently by Sir Rider Haggard) and Yeoman (1916).

Biffen founded the Journal of Agricultural Science and instrumental in the founding of the Genetical Society in 1918 and the National Institute of Agricultural Botany. He was elected Fellow of the Royal Society in 1914, was knighted in 1925, and received an honorary DSc in 1935 from the University of Reading. He had married Mary Hemus of Upton upon Severn in 1899 and they had no children. Biffen also took an interest in watercolour painting, gardening (with a special interest in auriculas), botany, photography, and archaeology. He died in Cambridge.
