= Norwich Research Park =

Research orientated business community in Norwich, England

- Established: 1992
- Field of research: Agricultural biotechnology Food biotechnology Industrial biotechnology Medical technology
- President: Roz Bird
- Location: NR4 7UG, Norwich, Norfolk, England; 52.623894°N 1.223946°E
- Website: norwichresearchpark.com

Norwich Research Park (NRP) is a science research park located to the southwest of Norwich in East Anglia close to the A11 and the A47 roads. Set in a 568-acre (230-hectare) area of parkland, it is one of five Biotechnology and Biological Sciences Research Council (BBSRC) funded research campuses and has one of Europe's largest concentrations of researchers in the fields of agriculture, genomics, health and the environment. It is the only site in the United Kingdom with three BBSRC funded research institutes and the focus of the community is on creating and supporting new companies and jobs based on bioscience.

It is also a partnership between the University of East Anglia, the Norfolk and Norwich University Hospital, and four independent world-renowned research institutes (John Innes Centre, Quadram Institute, Earlham Institute, and The Sainsbury Laboratory) that are linked to the Gatsby Charitable Foundation. There are over forty businesses located on the site across 100,000 square feet (9,300 m^{2}) of space with 12,000 people, including 3,000 researchers and clinicians with an annual research spend of £164 million.

== History ==
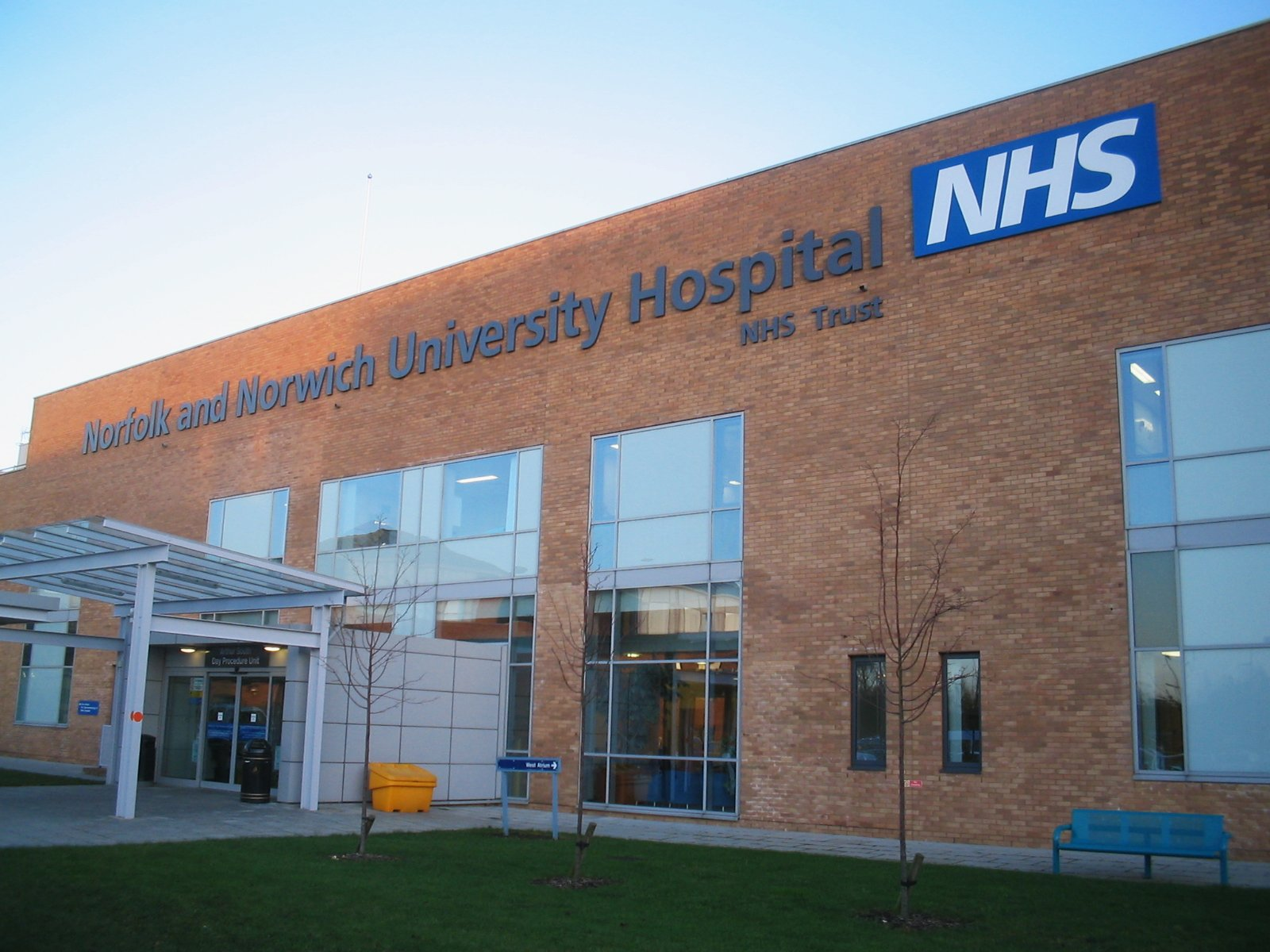
Norwich University Hospital

The Norfolk and Norwich Hospital officially opened in July 1772; it was closed in 2003 after its services had been transferred to the new Norfolk and Norwich University Hospital (NNUH). The earliest form of the Quadram Institute was founded in 1903 – the Long Ashton Research Station (LARS) which was an agricultural and horticultural government-funded research centre used for the cider industry. The BBSRC announced in 1999 that Long Ashton was to be closed. It was demolished in 2003.

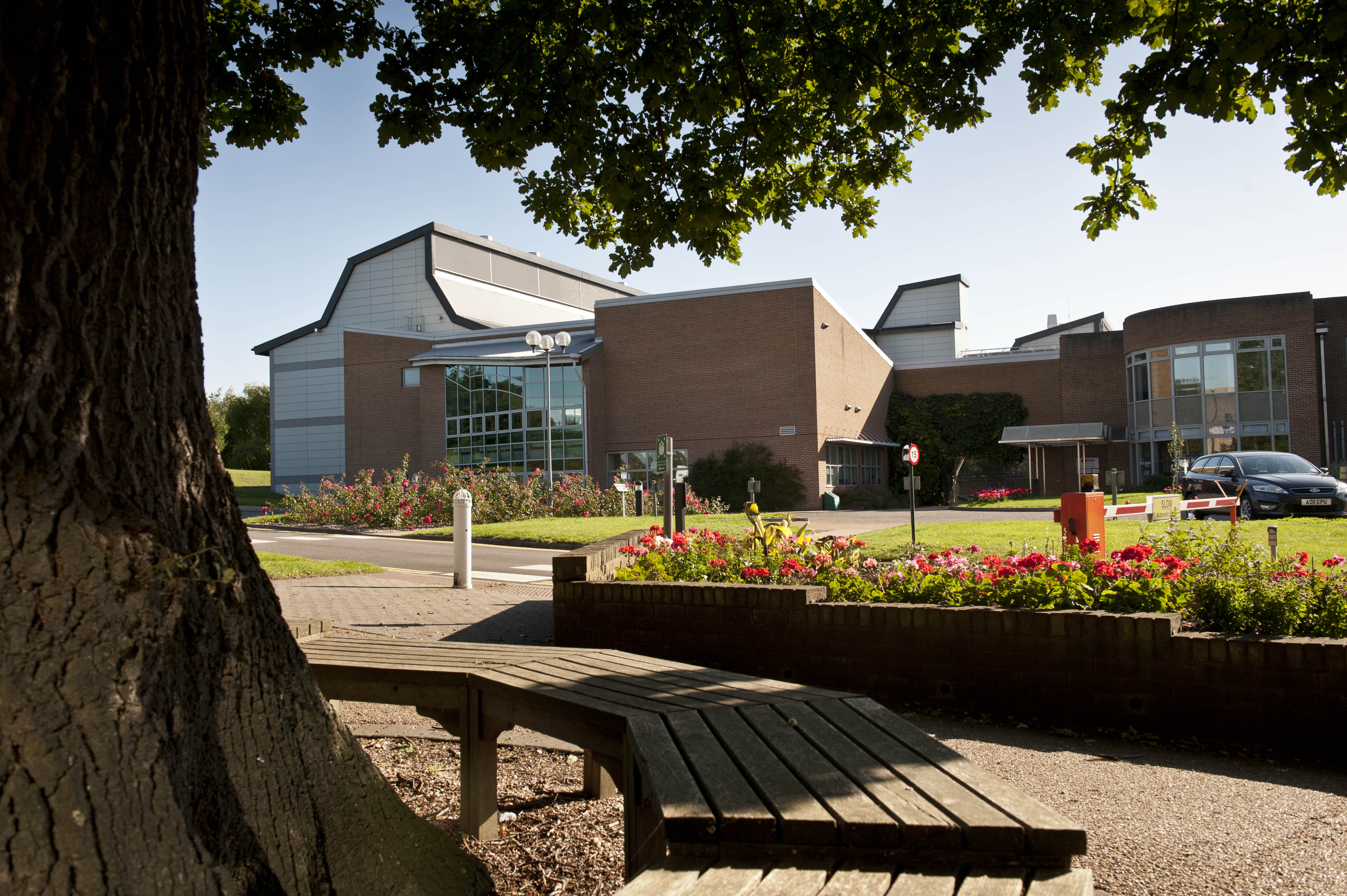
John Innes Centre

In 1904, London property developer John Innes died. He left his estate at Merton Park for the creation of the John Innes Horticultural Institution in 1910. It moved to its present site in 1967. The John Innes Foundation (JIF) was also formed in 1910, which acts as a charitable foundation that sponsors graduate studentships each year and also owns a collection of archive material. John Innes compost was developed by the institution in the 1930s, who donated the recipe to the "Dig for Victory" war effort. During the 1980s, the administration of the John Innes Institute was combined with that of the Plant Breeding Institute and the Nitrogen Fixation Laboratory. In 1994, following the relocation of the operations of other two organisations to the Norwich site, the three were merged as the John Innes Centre (JIC).

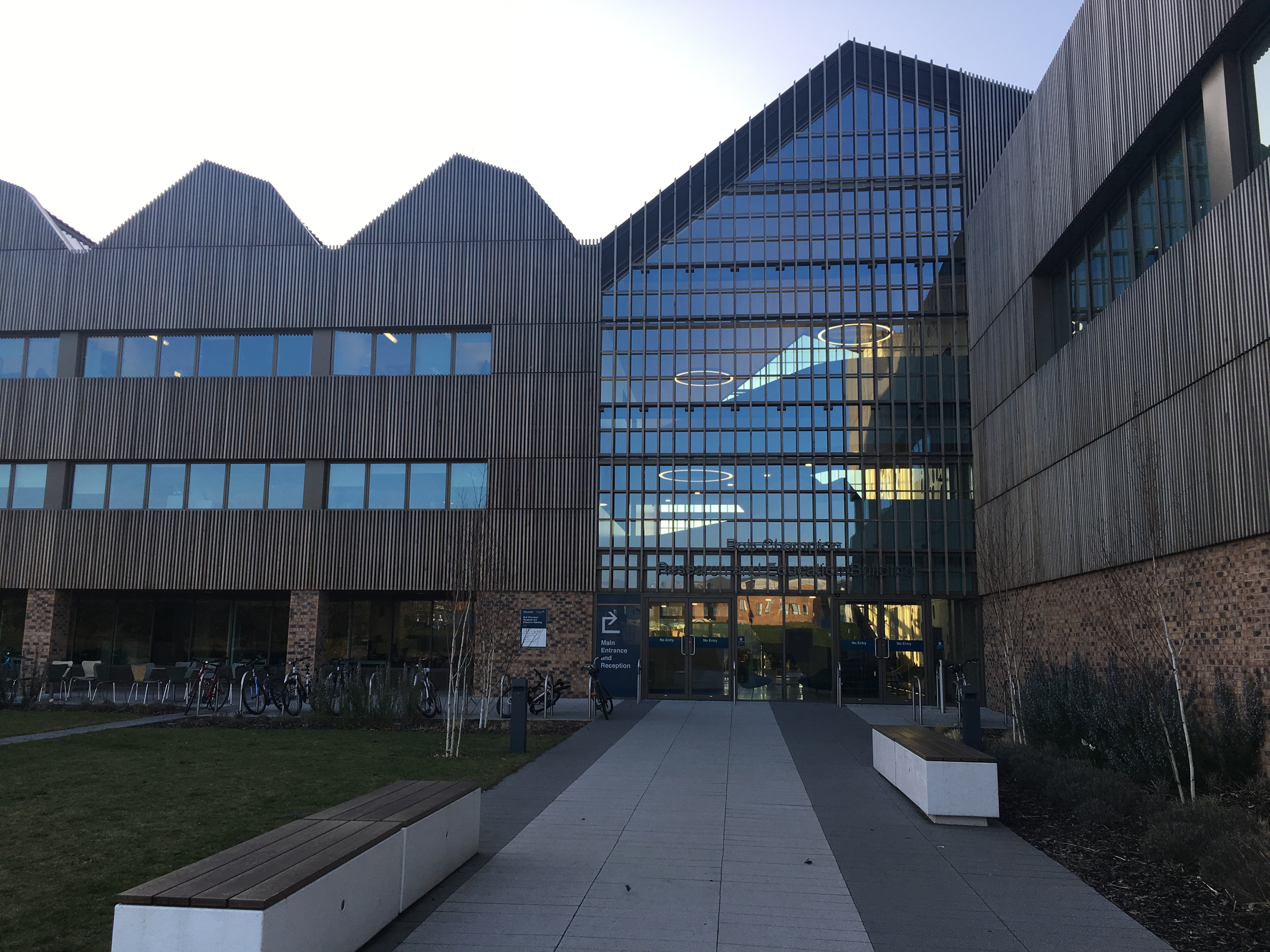
Bob Champion Research Building

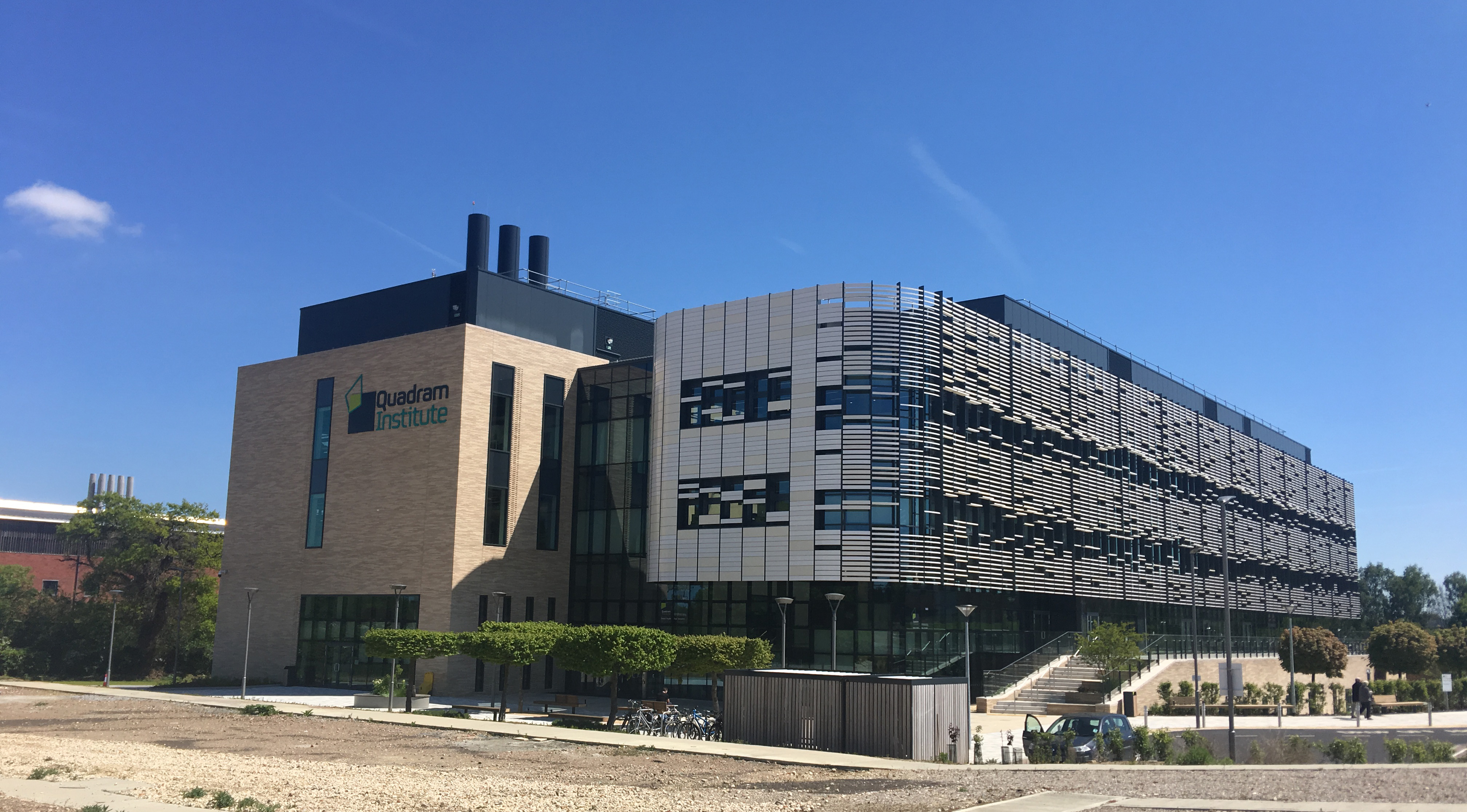
Quadram Institute

The University of East Anglia (UEA) was set up in April 1960 for biological sciences and English studies students. Attempts to establish a university in Norwich were made in 1919 and 1947, but due to a lack of government funding on both occasions the plans had to be postponed. Initially, teaching took place in the temporary "University Village", which was officially opened by the chairman of the University Grants Committee, Keith Murray, on 29 September 1963. UEA was one of the "plate glass universities" that were constructed during the decade to meet the demand for the expansion of higher education. UEA has a long-term partnership with the Norwich Science Festival which takes place each February at the Forum.

The Climatic Research Unit (CRU) was founded in 1972 as part of the university's School of Environmental sciences. In 1984, the CRU moved to a new cylindrical building designed by Rick Mather. In 2006, it was named the Hubert Lamb Building in honour of the first director. In 1988, for UEA's 25th-anniversary celebrations, King Charles III visited the CRU building. The research park was officially launched in 1992, comprising the UEA School of Biological Sciences and Chemistry, the John Innes Centre, the Ministry of Agriculture, Fisheries and Food (MAFF) Norwich Food Science Laboratory and the British Sugar Technical Centre. The Laboratory moved to York in 1992 while the Technical Centre closed its laboratories in 2001.

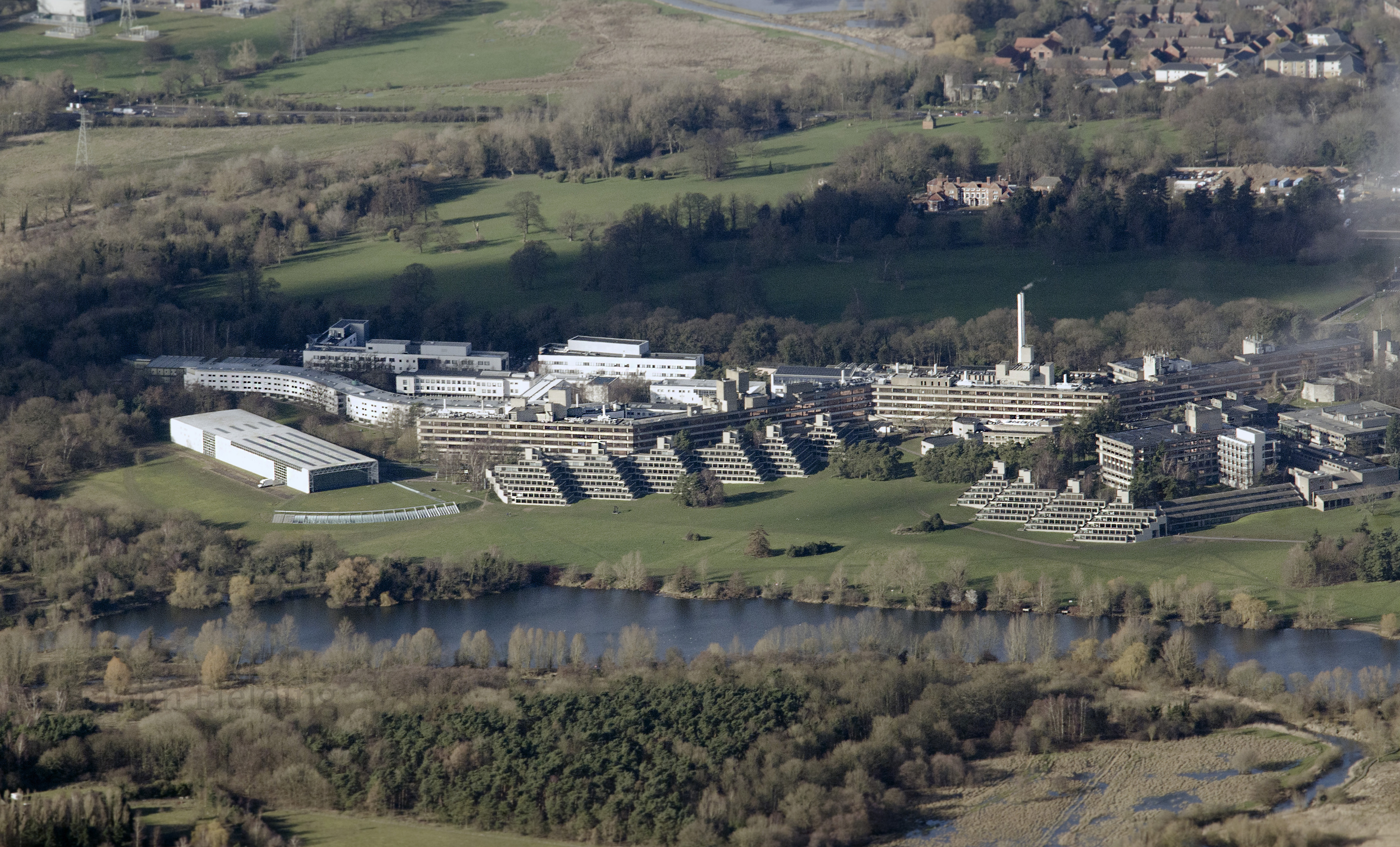
University of East Anglia

In 1987, an agreement was signed to establish The Sainsbury Laboratory (TSL) as a joint venture between the Gatsby Charitable Foundation. In 1989, the laboratory moved into its current building which was constructed alongside the JIC. The Earlham Institute (EI) was established by the BBSRC in partnership with East of England Development Agency (EEDA), Norfolk County Council, Norwich City Council, South Norfolk Council and the Greater Norwich Development Partnership. It cost £13.5 million and was built by Morgan Sindall. It was officially opened on 3 July 2009 by John Sulston. During the COVID-19 pandemic, the institute developed a new method (Microbiolink) which connects microbial proteins with host proteins and determines how these interactions influence cellular processes in the host.

The Institute of Food Research (IFR) was created in 1968, spread over four sites; the Meat Research Institute at Langford near Bristol, the Food Research Institute (FRI) at Colney in Norwich, the National Institute for Research in Dairying (NIRD) in Shinfield near Reading, and the Long Ashton Research Station (LARS). The IFR became an institute sponsored by the BBSRC in 1994. In 1999, the institute's activities were consolidated in one location (Norwich). On 28 April 2017, the IFR transitioned into Quadram Institute Bioscience in preparation for the full opening of the Quadram Institute (QI) in September 2018. The institute combines research teams from the partners with a regional gastrointestinal endoscopy unit and a clinical trials facility.

== Facilities ==
- The John Innes Centre (JIC), founded in 1910, an independent centre for research and training in plant and microbial science. In 2017, it was given a gold Athena SWAN Charter award which recognises good practices in higher education and research institutions towards the advancement of gender equality.
- The University of East Anglia (UEA), founded in 1963, a public plate glass research university and one of the nation's most-cited research institutions worldwide. Consisting of four faculties and twenty-six schools of study, it ranks in the Top 1% worldwide according to Times Higher Education, and within the world Top 100 for research excellence in the Leiden Ranking with UEA "often out-performing Russell Group universities".
- The Sainsbury Laboratory (TSL), founded in 1988, a research institute that carries out fundamental biological research and technology development on aspects of plant tissue culture and transformation, bioinformatics and computational biology, proteomics, and synthetic biology in plants.
- The Norfolk and Norwich University Hospital (NNUH), founded in 2001, a large National Health Service academic teaching hospital and is a partner with the University of East Anglia in the delivery of courses. It is one of the largest hospitals in the United Kingdom in terms of in-patient capacity.
- The Earlham Institute (EI), founded in 2009, a life science research institute focused on analysing plant, microbial, fish and farm animal genomes.
- The Quadram Institute (QI), founded in 2018, a state-of-the-art interdisciplinary research centre which combines expertise in food science, microbiology, and genomics with a gastrointestinal endoscopy unit and an NNUH clinical trials facility to promote health and prevent disease.
