= Andrew Reid (brewer) =

Scottish brewer and distiller (1751–1841)

Andrew Reid (1751–1841) was a Scottish brewer and distiller. He was High Sheriff of Hertfordshire in 1815.

== Early life ==
He was the son of John Reid of Tain (baptised 1721 – 1779) and his wife Mary Ross. He had two brothers, John, a merchant, and David, an officer in the Bengal Army.

Reid spent some of his early life in India; he made a voyage as supercargo on the Prince de Kaunitz, an Indiaman of the Imperial Asiatic Company of Trieste and Antwerp, in the later 1770s. From 1782, when he married, Reid was a partner in the London firm Gildart & Reid with his father-in-law. Andrew and David Reid were associates in the opium trade with the merchant William Fairlie.

Reid became a wine and spirit merchant, and distiller. From 1790 to 1793, when he left, he was the London resident of John Fergusson & Co., in partnership with John Fergusson and Fairlie in India, David Scott and others.

== Brewer ==
In 1793 Reid joined the brewers Meux & Jackson, which came to trade as Meux, Reid & Co. The injection of capital brought by Reid allowed the building of a very large vat, at the firm's Griffin Brewery. Five years later Robert Wigram joined. Working relationships in the firm became strained, when Reid began to suspect that part of the business was being run covertly. Matters came to a head with a chancery case brought by Reid, in 1808, against operations of Henry Meux, son of the founder Richard Meux (died 1813). The court ruled that a hidden distillery was being operated, and had to be sold: it was bought by purchasers from the Reid and Wigram families.

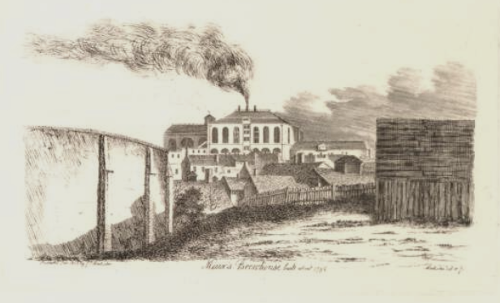
Meux's Brewhouse, built c.1796, on Liquor-pond Street, London

The brewery partnership was reconstituted in 1809, with Henry's younger brother Thomas Meux (1772–1842) representing the Meux family, with John Reid (died 1821)) a partner as well as his brother Andrew, who emerged as senior partner. In 1816 Thomas Meux left, and the firm went on to trade as Reid & Co.

== Quarrel with William Ross ==
Reid's mother Mary was the daughter of Andrew Ross, whose grandson William Ross, son of Mary's brother David Ross, was a writer for the East India Company. He became laird of Shandwick. Reid considered that William Ross's attentions paid to his sisters Helen and Charlotte were improper, and challenged Ross to a duel. Ross declined the challenge, on the pretext that Reid was a married man. Reid then arranged for his brother David to return from India, and challenge Ross in his place. A duel between David Reid and William Ross took place at Blackheath in May 1790, in which Ross was fatally wounded.

== Property ==
Reid leased 46 Bedford Square, London, from 1790 to 1796. In 1790 he bought the Greenhill Grove estate in Hertfordshire–known also as Pricklers–from the family of General Augustine Prevost, who had died in 1786. He sold it in 1810 to Richard Nicoll. He then moved to Lionsdown, part of Chipping Barnet, which he had bought in 1792. He improved the house, and lived there for the rest of his life. He contributed on the subject of Enfield Chase to John Middleton's View of the Agriculture of Middlesex (1807).

As a consequence of the death of William Ross, the title of his Shandwick estate came into the family. The matter was still open in 1871, when Andrew Gildart Reid, an older son of Nevile Reid, failed in a legal case. On the death of Miss Ross of Shandwick in 1872, four claimants emerged. By 1881, there were two claimants and the estate was in process of being divided between them. The claim of Nevile Reid (born 1839), son by his second marriage of Nevile Reid, the third son of Andrew Reid by his first marriage, had prevailed, and he was known as Reid of Shandwick.

== Family ==
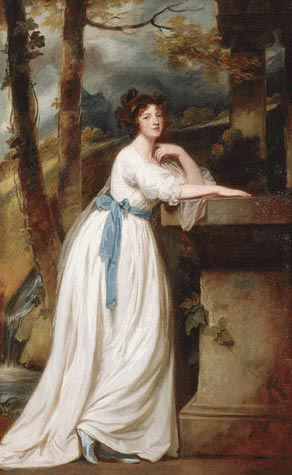
Harriet Reid, portrait from the 1780s by George Romney

Reid married, firstly in 1782, Harriet Gildart (1763–1802), daughter of Thomas Gildart, and granddaughter of Richard Gildart. They had four sons and a number of daughters. The sons were:

- Andrew Gildart Reid (born 1783), who died on a voyage to India at age 18.
- John Reid (1786–1792).
- Nevile Reid (1789–1839). He was briefly at Harrow School, leaving when his elder brother Andrew did in 1799. He served for a short time in the Royal Navy, and became a wine merchant. He married, firstly, Eliza Maria Boddam (died 1821), daughter of Rawson Hart Boddam. He married, secondly, in 1825, Caroline Napier (1798–1844), daughter of Francis Napier, 8th Lord Napier. He died in 1839. He was a banker in Windsor, and an investor in Manning & Anderdon.
- George Alexander Reid (1794–1852), army officer and Member of Parliament for Windsor.

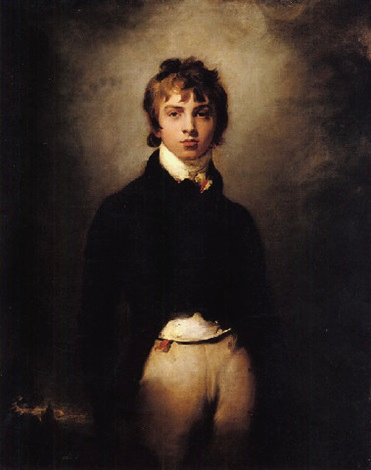
Andrew Gildart Reid, eldest son of Andrew Reid, 1799 portrait by Thomas Lawrence, "the ideal of Regency youth on the verge of manhood"

Of the daughters, Mary (1792–1849) married the West Indies merchant and plantation owner John Innes (1786–1869) and was mother of John Innes (1829–1904). Anna Maria (died 1870 aged 75) and Louisa (died 1881 aged 83) had St James Church, Gerrards Cross built in memory of their brother George Alexander; they did not marry.

Reid married, secondly in 1804, Jannet McNeil. She was the daughter of Delicia McNeil, whose mother Janet Ross had married John McKenzie; this was her second marriage. They had five sons:

- William Reid (1805–1867). He was educated at Harrow School, and entered Trinity College, Cambridge in 1820, but did not come into residence. He was a partner in Reid & Co. He married Louisa Margaret Barkly, daughter of the sugar merchant and plantation owner Aeneas Barkly, and sister of Henry Barkly. On moving away from Lyonsdown, which passed to him on his father's death, he sold it to the merchant John Cattley. He then resided at The Node, Codicote, between Hitchin and Welwyn.
- Hugh Reid, died unmarried.
- Henry Reid, a cleric, died unmarried. On his ordination in 1830 as a deacon he became a stipendiary curate at Great Bardfield, Essex. From 1841 to 1851 he was without a living, residing in Barnet.
- David Reid.
- Robert Reid, died without issue. He married in 1842 Dora Loraine Fraser, daughter of James Fraser, 6th of Achnagairn and Dora Macrae. Her grandmother Jean McKenzie, who married John Fraser, 5th of Achnagairn, was a first cousin of Jannet, Robert's mother. Her sister Helen married Huntley Duff.
