= Quadram Institute =

Research centre in Norwich, England

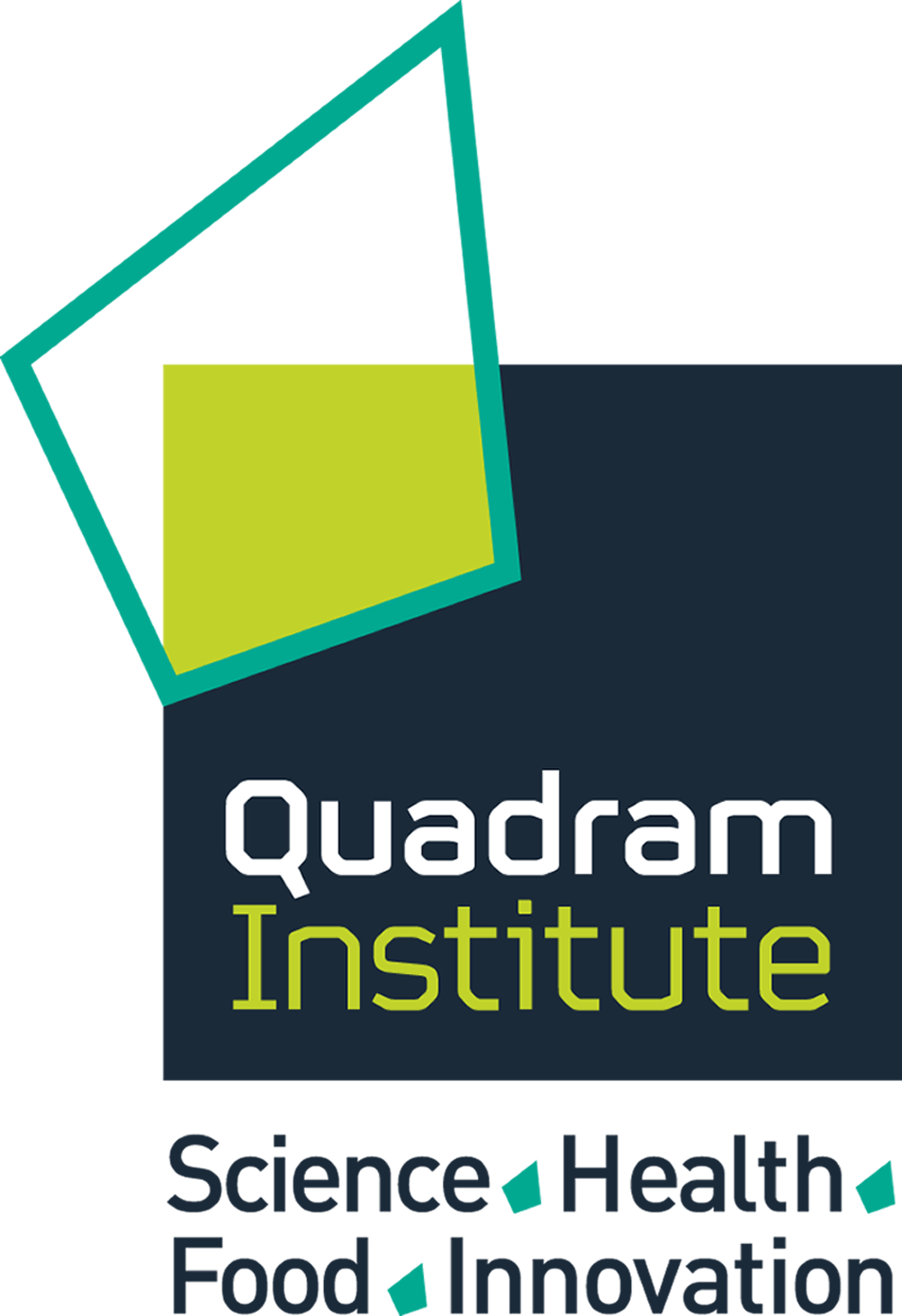

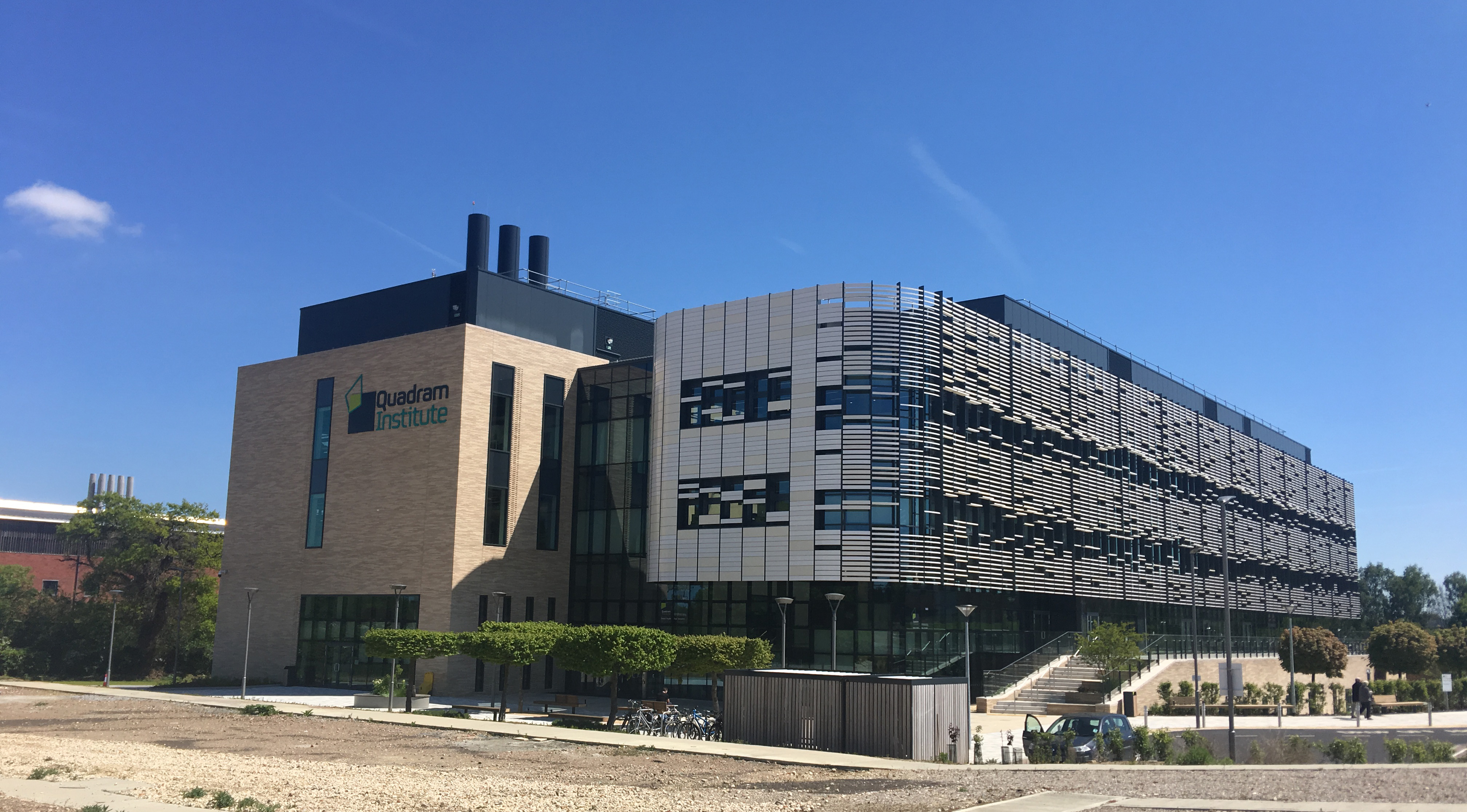
- The Quadram Institute

- Abbreviation: QI
- Predecessor: Low Temperature Research Station (LTRS); National Institute for Research in Dairying (NIRD)
- Formation: 2017; 9 years ago
- Legal status: Non-profit research institute and charity
- Location: Norwich Research Park, Colney, NR4 7UQ
- Coordinates: 52.6230976°N 1.218573°E grid reference TG183077
- Services: Food science
- Members: 400 scientists and clinicians
- Director: Professor Daniel Figeys
- Budget: £17,025,000
- Website: quadram.ac.uk

Institute of Food Research
- Founded at: Norwich
- Registration no.: Companies House: 03009972; Charity Commission: 1058499
- Location: Norwich Research Park, Colney, Norwich NR4 7UA
- Region served: United Kingdom
- Methods: Research
- Budget: (2016)
- Revenue: £15,176,000 (2016)
- Staff: 164 (2016)
- Website: quadram.ac.uk

The Quadram Institute is a centre for food and health research, combining Quadram Institute Bioscience (formerly the Institute of Food Research), the Norfolk and Norwich University Hospitals' endoscopy centre and aspects of the University of East Anglia's Norwich Medical School and the Faculty of Science. It is located on the outskirts of Norwich, England, and is a member of the Norwich Research Park.

The institute is housed in a purpose-built facility on the Norwich Research Park that opened in 2018. Its founding partners are Quadram Institute Bioscience, University of East Anglia, Norfolk and Norwich University Hospital and the Biotechnology and Biological Sciences Research Council. The institute combines research teams from the partners with a regional gastrointestinal endoscopy unit and a clinical trials facility. The first patients were treated in the endoscopy unit in December 2018.

== History ==
The Institute of Food Research was created in 1968, spread over four sites; the Meat Research Institute at Langford near Bristol, the Food Research Institute (FRI) at Colney in Norwich, the National Institute for Research in Dairying (NIRD) in Shinfield near Reading, and the Long Ashton Research Station. At the end of 1990, the Meat Research Institute Bristol laboratory was closed, and in 1992 the National Institute for Research in Dairying Reading laboratory was moved to the campus of the University of Reading. In 1999, the institute's activities were consolidated in one location: Norwich. On 28 April 2017, the Institute of Food Research transitioned into Quadram Institute Bioscience, ahead of a full opening of the Quadram Institute in 2018. The founding director is Ian Charles, who was appointed in 2015.

== Research focus ==
The Quadram Institute has a research programme that covers:

- Food innovation and health
- Gut microbes and health
- Microbes in the food chain
- Food, microbes and public health.

== Building ==
Construction of the Quadram Institute building began in February 2016, and the building opened in September 2018. Wates Construction is the main contractor. It was designed by the London office of architects NBBJ. The building can house 300 scientists and 100 staff supporting the endoscopy centre with capacity for 40,000 endoscopy outpatient visits each year.

== See also ==
- Science and technology in the United Kingdom
- Research Councils UK
