= John Innes (philanthropist) =

English property developer and philanthropist (1829–1904)

John Innes JP (20 January 1829 – 8 August 1904) was a British property developer and philanthropist. From the 1860s he developed Merton Park as a garden suburb in Merton, Surrey. In his will, he left funds and part of his estate at Merton for the establishment of a horticultural institute. This institute, the John Innes Centre, continues to bear his name today, as does John Innes compost, formulated at the institute.

== Family ==
Innes was born on 20 January 1829 in Hampstead, Middlesex (now London Borough of Camden). He was the sixth of seven children of West Indies merchant John Innes (1786 – 1869) and his wife Mary Reid (1792 – 1849), a daughter of brewer Andrew Reid. The family owned sugar plantations in Jamaica and imported rum into England. They supported the anti-slavery campaign in the West Indies and eventually sold all the business interests. Innes was educated at boarding school in Brighton.

== Career ==
Innes's early career was as a wine merchant in the City of London, but, in 1864, he founded the City of London Real Property Company with his older brother James. The company developed and managed office buildings in the City, but also purchased farm land in Merton in 1864 and created the Merton Park Estate Company. For his own home, Innes purchased Manor Farm. Around 1872, Innes became Lord of the manor of Merton.

On the Merton land, Innes developed a garden suburb with wide roads of houses designed by architect H G Quartermain between 1870 and 1904. In the 1890s, Innes's own house was rebuilt to a Quartermain design as the Manor House. As part of the promotion of the suburb, Innes arranged for the local railway station to be renamed from Lower Merton to Merton Park in 1887.

Innes was chairman of trustees of a charity established by William Rutlish, Embroiderer to Charles II, on his death in 1687. The charity's function was to provide funds to educate the poor children of the parish of Merton, but by the 1890s the charity had accumulated a considerable excess of funds. Innes used some of this excess to establish Rutlish School.

John Innes remained a bachelor until his death on 8 August 1904 and was buried in the churchyard of St Mary the Virgin, Merton Park. He left most of the grounds of the Manor House to be converted into a public park for the benefit of the residents of the parishes of Merton and Morden. He left funds and his home, Manor Farm in Watery Lane, and its grounds for the creation of the horticultural institute which still bears his name, the John Innes Centre. His bequest to the nation was to be used for either a school of horticulture that would provide "technical instruction in the principles of the science and art of horticulture and the application thereof to the industry or employment of gardening", or a public museum for the collection of paintings and other works of art. In 1906, the trustees asked the Charity Commissioners to prepare a scheme and by 1908 the scheme was approved by both trustees and Board of Agriculture. On 12 January 1909 the scheme came into force and in 1910 the John Innes Horticultural Institution opened.

The John Innes institute moved from Merton Park in 1945 and is now located in Colney, Norfolk, a world leader in plant science and microbiology. John Innes compost, now widely used in gardening, was developed by the centre. The grounds of Innes's home south of Watery Lane are now the site of Rutlish School, John Innes Park and John Innes Recreation Ground. The Manor House in Watery Lane, is used by the school and a blue plaque identifying it as his former residence was placed there in 1978.

A local conservation group, the John Innes Society, is dedicated to safeguarding and improving the built and natural environment in and around the Merton Park area.
