= Earlham Institute =

Life science research institute in Norwich, England

Coordinates: 52.6269°N 1.219°E

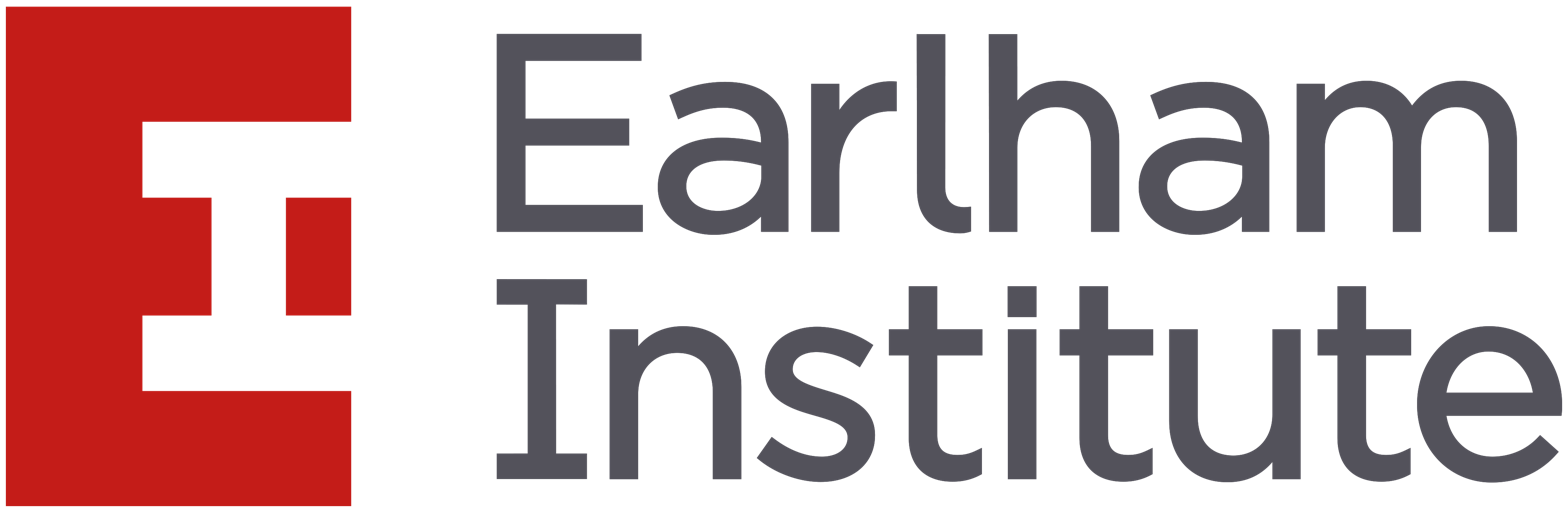
- Motto: Decoding Living Systems
- Established: 3 July 2009
- Field of research: Genomics; Computational bioscience
- Director: Professor Neil Hall
- Location: Norwich Research Park, Colney, Norfolk, NR4 7UZ, England
- Affiliations: Norfolk County Council; Norwich City Council; South Norfolk Council
- Operating agency: Biotechnology and Biological Sciences Research Council
- Website: www.earlham.ac.uk

Earlham Institute (EI, formerly The Genome Analysis Centre) is a life science research institute located at the Norwich Research Park (NRP), Norwich, England. EI's research is focused on exploring living systems by applying computational science and biotechnology to answer ambitious biological questions and generate enabling resources. It is situated on the Norwich Research Park, to the west of Norwich on the former A47 (B1108), and adjacent to the west of the University of East Anglia.

== History ==
The institute was established by the Biotechnology and Biological Sciences Research Council in partnership with East of England Development Agency (EEDA), Norfolk County Council, Norwich City Council, South Norfolk Council and the Greater Norwich Development Partnership. It cost £13.5 million, and was built by Morgan Sindall. It was officially opened on 3 July 2009 by John Sulston, winner of the 2002 Nobel Prize in Physiology or Medicine, and former Director of the Wellcome Trust Sanger Institute, another genomics research institution.

== Function ==
This institute wants to be at the forefront of data intensive science in biology, a leader in bioinformatics innovation and the application of genome technology, to enable bioscience through dissemination of the data and technology produced in the institute as well as in collaboration with scientists worldwide.

Project specialisms include wheat and ryegrass, but the wider research carried out includes vertebrate, evolutionary, environment, and regulatory genomics as well as data infrastructure and software development to support the international bioscience community. EI makes its research open access where possible.

One of the responsibilities of EI is to communicate the science it undertakes to a range of audiences, such as the international scientific community, the general public, school children, and students. It runs various programmes throughout the year to deliver this responsibility, as well as producing editorial features to explain the research it carries out.

== Directors ==
Earlham Institute has been directed by:

- Jane Rogers from July 2009 to December 2012
- Mario Caccamo from January 2013 to July 2015
- Dylan Edwards from August 2015 (Interim Director)
- Neil Hall from April 2016 (Current Director)

== Facilities ==
=== Sequencing platforms ===
EI is equipped with next-generation sequencing and genomics platforms for high-throughput data generation for research projects. EI historically has been an early adopter of new technologies for its scientific research, but also makes these available to the UK bioscience community through its National Capability in Genomics.

- Illuina NovaSeq
- Illumina HiSeq 2500
- Illumina MiSeq
- Illumina iSeq100
- PacBio Sequel
- PacBio Sequel II
- Oxford Nanopore MinION
- Oxford Nanopore GridION
- 10X Chromium

== Pandemic support ==
Scientists at Earlham Institute and Quadram Institute are helping to develop a new tool to translate the dynamic microbiome/body communication. The method would be useful to researchers seeking to learn how microbes impact safety, the modifications contributing to illness, and pointing to new targets for medicines.
