= Colonel Frank Seely Academy =

Location
- Flatts Lane; Calverton, Nottinghamshire, NG14 6JZ; England; 53.04071°N 1.08497°W

Information
- Type: Academy
- Motto: Inspire, Challenge, Succeed
- Established: 1957
- Local authority: Nottinghamshire
- Trust: Redhill Academy Trust
- Department for Education URN: 144182 Tables
- Ofsted: Reports
- Chair of Governors: Phil Lovett
- Headteacher: Nicola Pearson
- Gender: Coeducational
- Age: 11 to 18
- Enrolment: 895 as of May 2026
- Capacity: 1,091
- Houses: Dean, Whitehead, McKenzie, Poyzer
- Colours: Yellow, Red, Blue, Green
- Website: www.cfsacademy.org.uk

Colonel Frank Seely Academy (formerly Colonel Frank Seely School) is a coeducational secondary school and sixth form located in Calverton in the English county of Nottinghamshire.

The school is named after Frank Evelyn Seely (1864–1928), a former High Sheriff of Nottinghamshire and Councillor for Calverton on Nottinghamshire County Council.

== History ==
In September 1957 the Colonel Frank Seely School was opened in memory of him.

The proposed Calverton County Secondary School was renamed at the end of January 1957. Mr J D Dixon became head teacher in May 1957.

It was officially opened on Thursday 22 May 1958 by the wife of Colonel Seely.

=== Construction ===
There was a £58,000 construction to enlarge the school to three form entry in the early 1960s.

In December 1972, the local councils agreed to build a sports centre with a swimming pool. A similar sports centre would be built by the county council at the Rushcliffe School. The sports centre was officially opened on Thursday 26 June 1975, built by Notts County Council.

Many buildings were opened in October 1978.

=== Comprehensive ===
The school became comprehensive in September 1973. Roy Sowden became the headmaster from September 1977. He was the former deputy head of Rhyl High School in north Wales. He moved to The Dukeries Academy in 1982, when Gordon Scott took over.

Arthur Scargill spoke at a meeting of Nottinghamshire miners on Tuesday 17 September 1985, and again on Saturday 8 January 1987 and October 1987. Conservative education minister Michael Fallon visited in October 1991.

=== Academy ===
Previously a community school administered by Nottinghamshire County Council, in October 2017 Colonel Frank Seely School converted to academy status and was renamed Colonel Frank Seely Academy. The school is now sponsored by Redhill Academy Trust. Mr. Jonathan Gale became the headteacher in January 2017. As of 2026, Mr Jonathan Gale has left Colonel Frank Seely Academy. The new head teacher is Mrs. Nicola Pearson.

== Curriculum ==
Colonel Frank Seely Academy offers GCSEs and BTECs as programmes of study for pupils, while students in the sixth form have the option to study from a range of A Levels and further BTECs.

== Notable former pupils ==
- Chris Adcock, badminton player
- Steve Cherry, goalkeeper for Notts County in the 1990s
- Christopher Dean, figure skater and Olympic gold medalist
- Russell Evans (cricketer)
- Neil Hall, PhD, geneticist
- Mark Spencer, Conservative MP for Sherwood (2010–2024)
- Richard Whitehead, athlete
- Sam Wood, cricketer

== Former teachers ==
- Dean Jackson, BBC Radio Nottingham presenter, biology teacher since the 1980s
