= Unwins Seeds =

British seed company

Unwins Seeds Ltd.
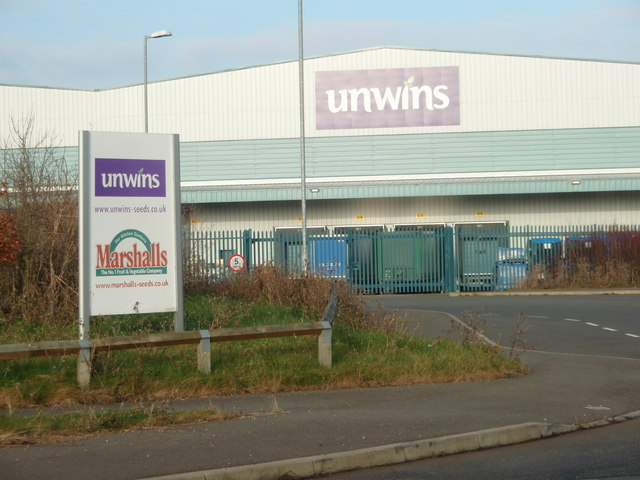
- Warehouse in Alconbury Weston, UK
- Type: Limited company
- Industry: Horticulture
- Founded: 1903
- Headquarters: Alconbury Weston, England, UK
- Area served: UK
- Products: Seeds
- Website: www.unwins.co.uk

Unwins Seeds is a British seed company based in Alconbury Weston, Huntingdon in Cambridgeshire. The Times described Unwins as "a firm that has grown ... to become one of the most familiar features of Britain’s horticultural landscape", and the BBC called the company "world-famous".

== History ==
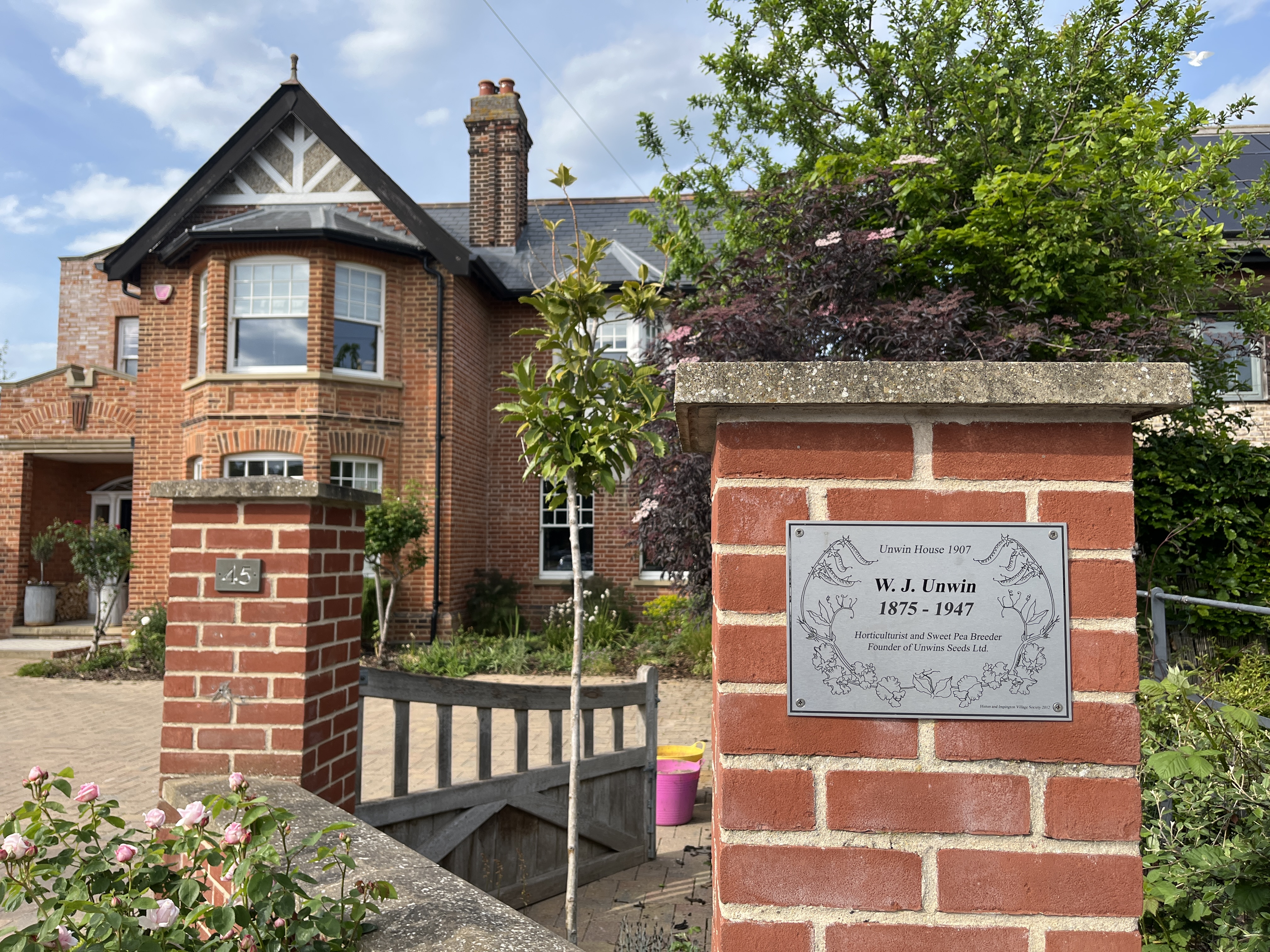
Commemorative plaque on the former house of William Unwin, Histon

Unwins Seeds was formed in 1903 by William Unwin by selling sweet pea seeds. His son Charles, who had an interest in sweet peas, joined the business in 1914. A brother Frank had an interest in gladioli. In the late 1950s the company sold packets of seeds to gardening shops in full colour packets. Later it would supply garden centres, which helped the business to blossom.

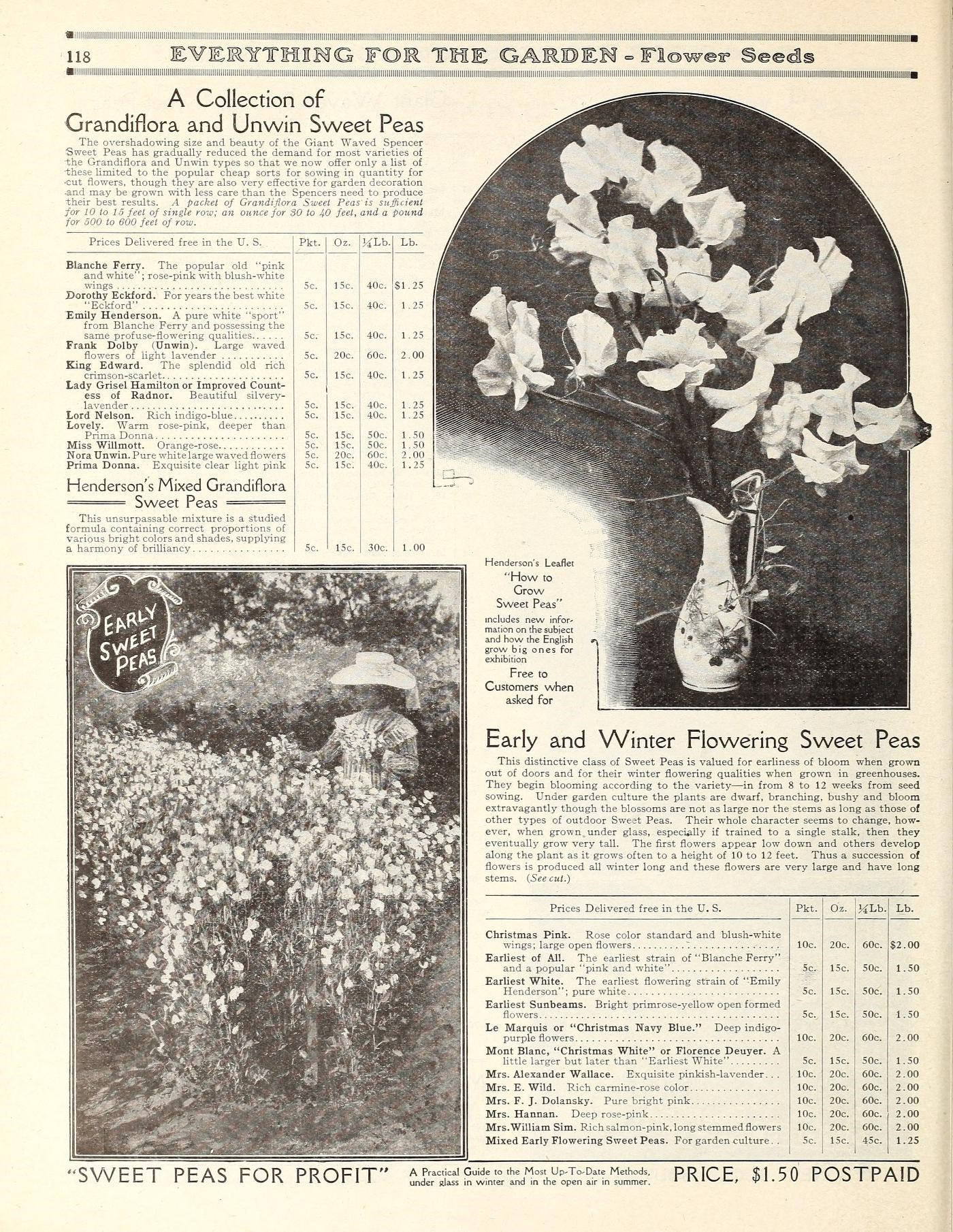
Ad offering Unwins Sweet Peas, 1912

In 2003, the firm celebrated its centenary by publishing The Unwins Century, an illustrated volume by Colin Hambidge, and by launching the Unwins Centennial Dahlia. The company continues to be a leader in the development of types of sweet pea. Most of the sweet pea seeds are from countries outside of the UK, picked by hand.

=== Ownership ===
Unwins was based in Histon, just north of Cambridge but is now situated on the eastern side of the A1(M) just north of the A14 Alconbury junction. The company was bought by Westland Horticulture of Dungannon, County Tyrone in August 2004.
