= Westland Horticulture =

British agriculture and gardening company

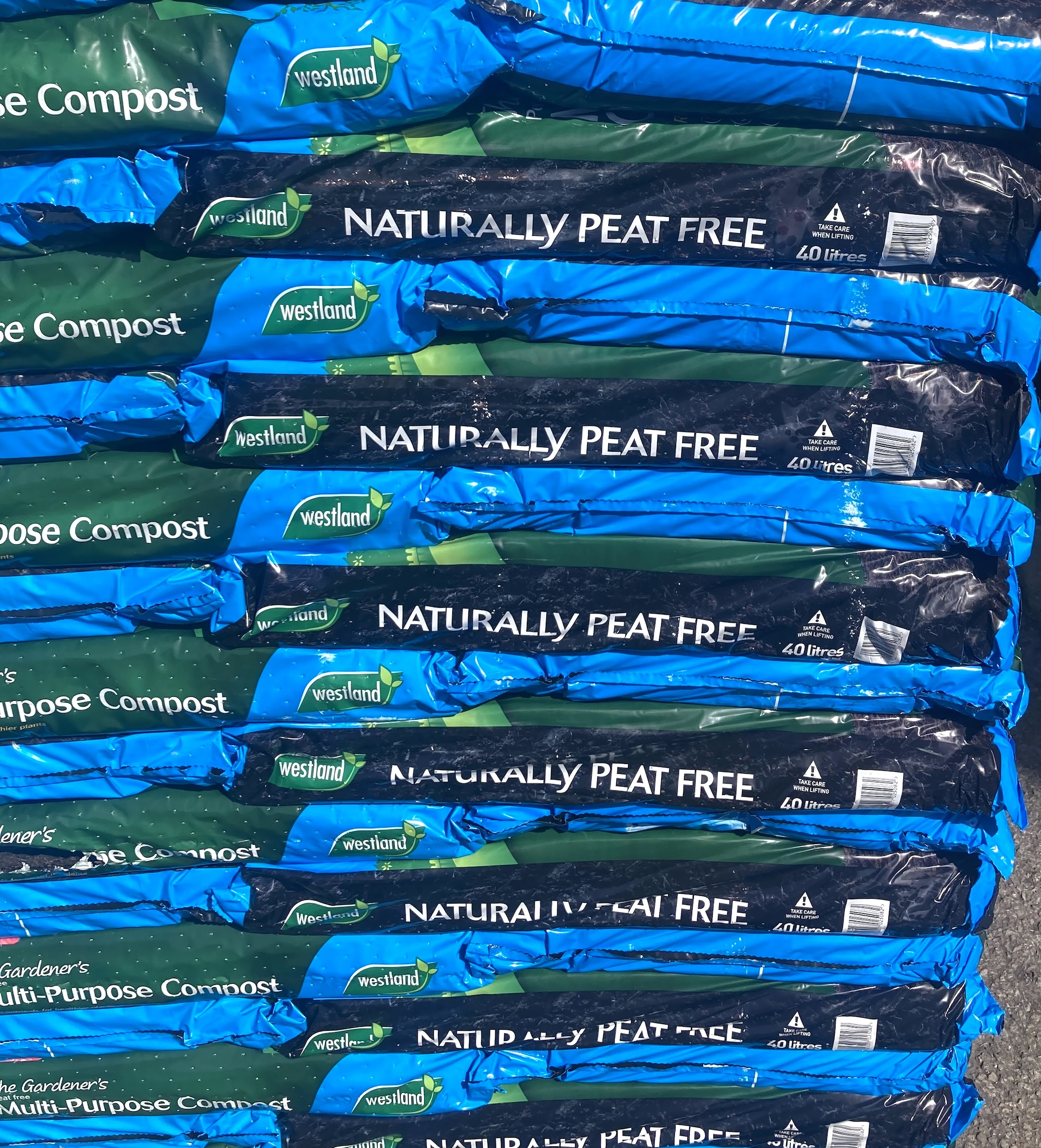
Peat-free compost by Westland Horticulture

Westland Horticulture is a British company based in Dungannon, Northern Ireland that sells compost, seeds and garden and agriculture materials.

The company was founded in 1990 by Edward Conroy and Robert Lavery, initially with a business plan of selling materials for mushroom farming and later offering materials like John Innes compost. It took over seed company Unwins Seeds in 2004.
