= Neil Hall =

- Education: University of Liverpool
- Scientific career
- Fields: Genetics
- Workplaces: Earlham Institute

Professor Neil Hall is head of the Earlham Institute, a life science research centre in Norwich, England, and director of the Hall Group, which aims to understand why some infectious agents are more damaging than others.

== Early life and education ==
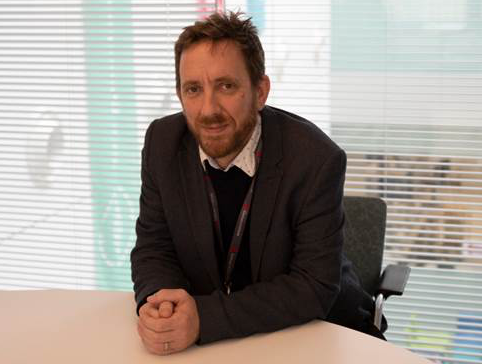
Professor Neil Hall

Neil Hall studied at Colonel Frank Seely School in Calverton, Nottinghamshire. He is dyslexic and at school was drawn to science as it was an area in which he felt he could excel. He was fascinated by genetics and inheritance. He has a B.S. in genetics and a PhD in molecular biology from the University of Liverpool.

== Career ==
Hall was a professor at the University of Liverpool from 2007 to 2016. From April 2016 he has been head of the Earlham Institute where he leads the Hall Group, which aims to understand why some infectious agents are more damaging than others.

In May 2020, he proposed weekly testing for COVID-19 to cover the whole of Norwich.

== Selected publications ==
- "Genome sequence of the human malaria parasite Plasmodium falciparum", Nature, 419 (6906), 498-511 (joint)
- "The genome of the African trypanosome Trypanosoma brucei", Science, 309 (5733), 416-422 (joint)
- "The genome of the social amoeba Dictyostelium discoideum", Nature, 435 (7038), 43-57 (joint)
- "Genomic sequence of the pathogenic and allergenic filamentous fungus Aspergillus fumigatus", Nature, 438 (7071), 1151 (joint)
- "Accurate determination of microbial diversity from 454 pyrosequencing data", Nature Methods, 6 (9), 639-641 (joint)
