= Meat Research Institute =

- Location within Somerset

General information
- Type: Biology Research Centre
- Location: Lower Langford, North Somerset, BS18 7DY
- Coordinates: 51.345°N 2.78°W
- Elevation: 30 m (98 ft)
- Current tenants: Vacated
- Construction started: 1964
- Completed: November 1967
- Inaugurated: 19 April 1968
- Client: Meat and Livestock Commission

Design and construction
- Architects: Oatley & Brentnall
- Main contractor: Holland, Hannen & Cubitts

The Meat Research Institute was a research institute in North Somerset. It was founded in 1967 to provide research for the British meat industry.

== History ==
In the late 1950s there was a need in the UK for a meat research institute, but no further plans. In March 1962 there was a meeting with thirty one meat producers and representatives from the government and it was decided to build a meat research institute, costing around £500,000 and annual running costs of around £100,000. The first director was appointed in February 1963, before the building construction had begun, who came from the Low Temperature Research Station in Cambridge. It was decided to put the research institute next to the veterinary school. Planning permission for the site was issued in May 1963.

To pay for the cost of the institute, the government put a levy on livestock, later administered by the Meat and Livestock Commission. In October 1966, a new £1m Food Research Institute was announced to be built at Norwich, similarly next to the university. The institute in Somerset was hoped to open in the autumn of 1967. In November 1967 staff moved in.

The Queen, with the Duke of Northumberland and Henry Somerset, 10th Duke of Beaufort, officially opened the new institute on 19 April 1968, also opening new buildings of the veterinary school next door. Buglers played The Roast Beef of Old England.

It became part of the IFR in Norfolk in 1985, when merged with the National Institute for Research in Dairying, which is now the Quadram Institute Bioscience. In 1990 the government decided to stop funding to the research institute, and the research institute closed in December 1990.

== Structure ==
It was at Lower Langford in North Somerset. It was situated next to the Langford House School of Veterinary Science, on the B3133 (for Congresbury), north of the A38.

== See also ==
- British Meat Processors Association
