= Huntley Duff =

Scottish cricketer

Personal information
- Full name: Huntley George Gordon Duff
- Born: 5 July 1822; Inverness, Inverness-shire, Scotland
- Died: 26 May 1856 (aged 33); Inverness, Inverness-shire, Scotland
- Batting: Unknown
- Bowling: Unknown

Domestic team information
- Years: Team
- 1844: Marylebone Cricket Club

Career statistics
Competition	First-class
Matches	2
Runs scored	9
Batting average	2.25
100s/50s	–/–
Top score	6
Balls bowled	280
Wickets	9
Bowling average	9.75
5 wickets in innings	1
10 wickets in match	–
Best bowling	7/40
Catches/stumpings	3/–
- Source: Cricinfo, 4 August 2019

Huntley George Gordon Duff (5 July 1822 – 26 May 1856) was a Scottish first-class cricketer.

The eleventh and youngest child of Major Hugh Robert Duff and his wife, Sarah Louise Forbes, Duff was born at Inverness in July 1822. He was educated at Harrow School, attending from 1837 to 1839. He later made two appearances in first-class cricket, the first in 1844 for the Marylebone Cricket Club against Oxford University at Lord's, with the second coming for the Gentlemen of England against the Gentlemen of Kent at Canterbury in 1846. Playing as a bowler, Duff took 9 wickets in his two matches, with best innings figures of 7 for 40. He married Helen Fraser in June 1847, with the couple having two children. He died at Muirburn House in Inverness in May 1856.
