= Instruments used in gastroenterology =

This is a list of instruments used specially in Gastroenterology.

== Instrument list ==
Instrument	Uses
Gastroscope	Used to perform esophagogastroduodenoscopy (EGD/OGD)
Duodenoscope	Used to perform ERCP
Enteroscope	Used to perform push enteroscopy
Colonoscope	Used to perform colonoscopy
Flexible sigmoidoscope	Used to perform flexible sigmoidoscopy
Rigid sigmoidoscope	Used to perform rigid sigmoidoscopy
Ultrasound endoscope	Used to perform endoscopic ultrasound (EUS)
Video capsule	Used to perform video capsule enteroscopy
Endoscopy snare	Used to perform polypectomy and endoscopic foreign body removal
Band ligator	Used to perform variceal band ligation
Sengstaken–Blakemore tube	Used in the management of bleeding esophageal varices
Balloon dilator	Used to perform esophageal balloon dilatation, pyloric dilatation or ileocolonic dilatation
Savary-Gilliard dilator	Used to perform esophageal bougie dilatation
Heater probe	Used to perform endoscopic heater probe thermocoagulation of bleeding blood vessels
APC unit	Used to perform endoscopic Argon plasma coagulation
PEG tube	Used to perform percutaneous endoscopic gastrostomy
Menghini needle or Tru-Cut needle	Used to perform percutaneous liver biopsy

== Image gallery ==
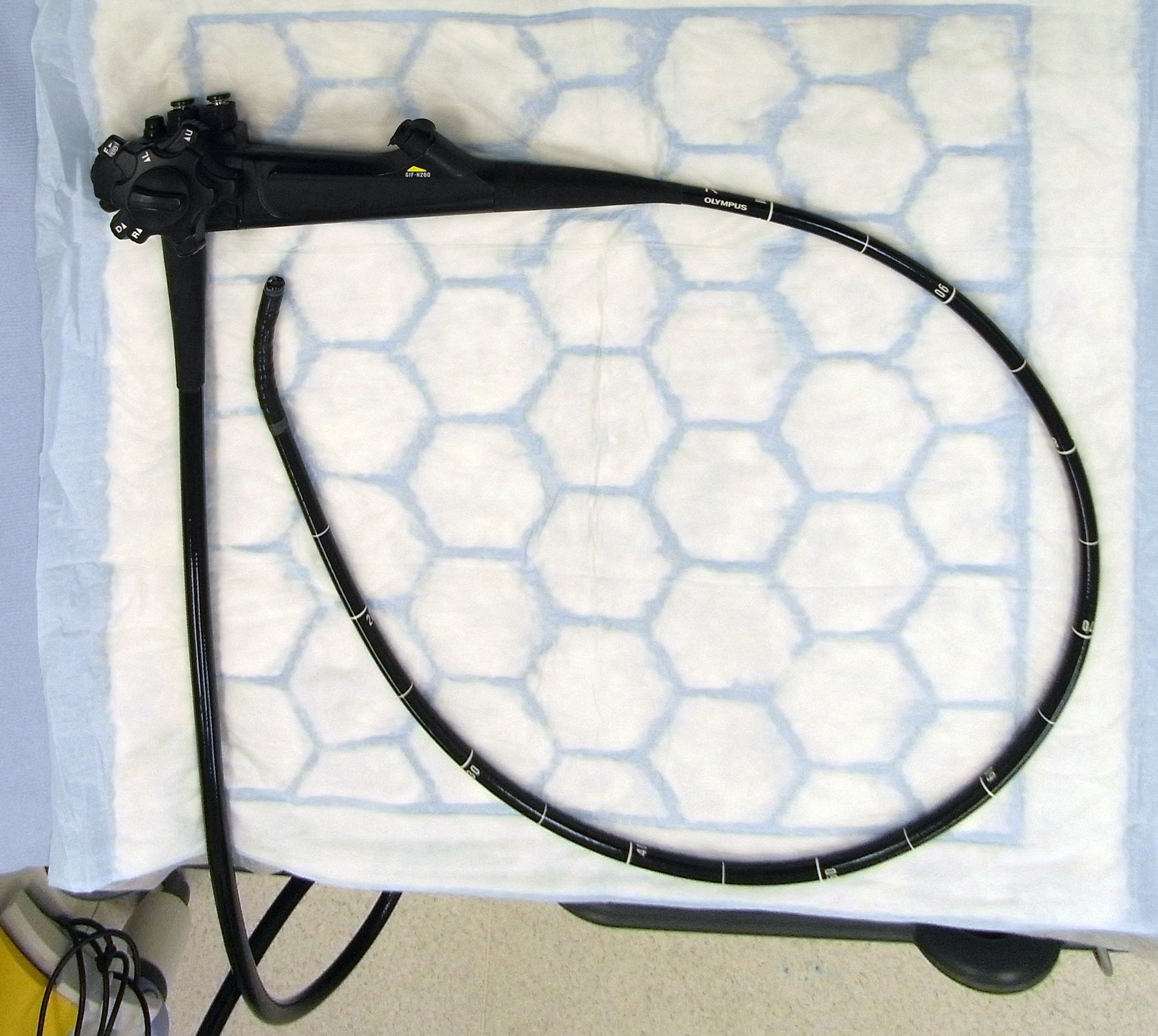
Video gastroscope

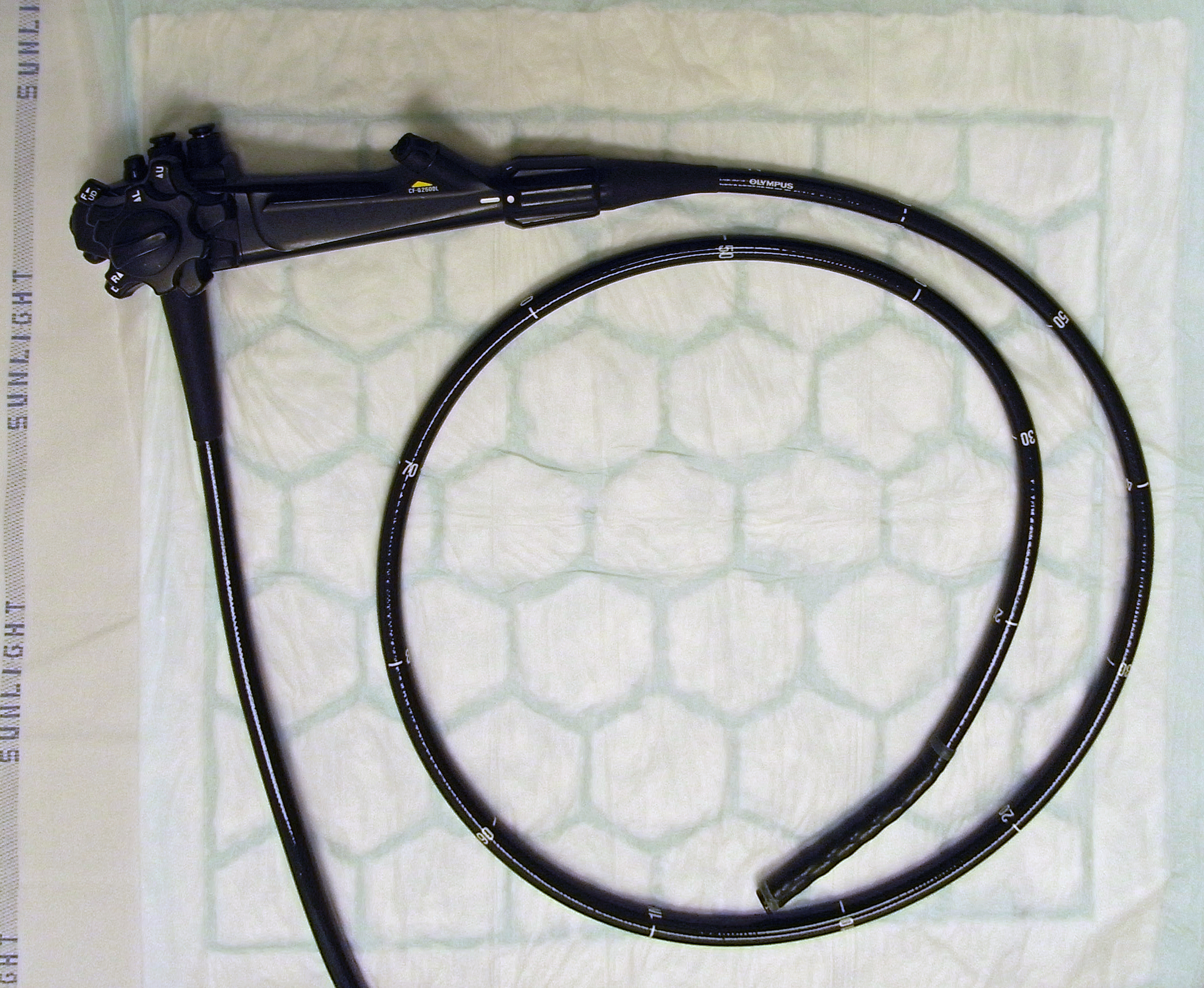
Video colonoscope

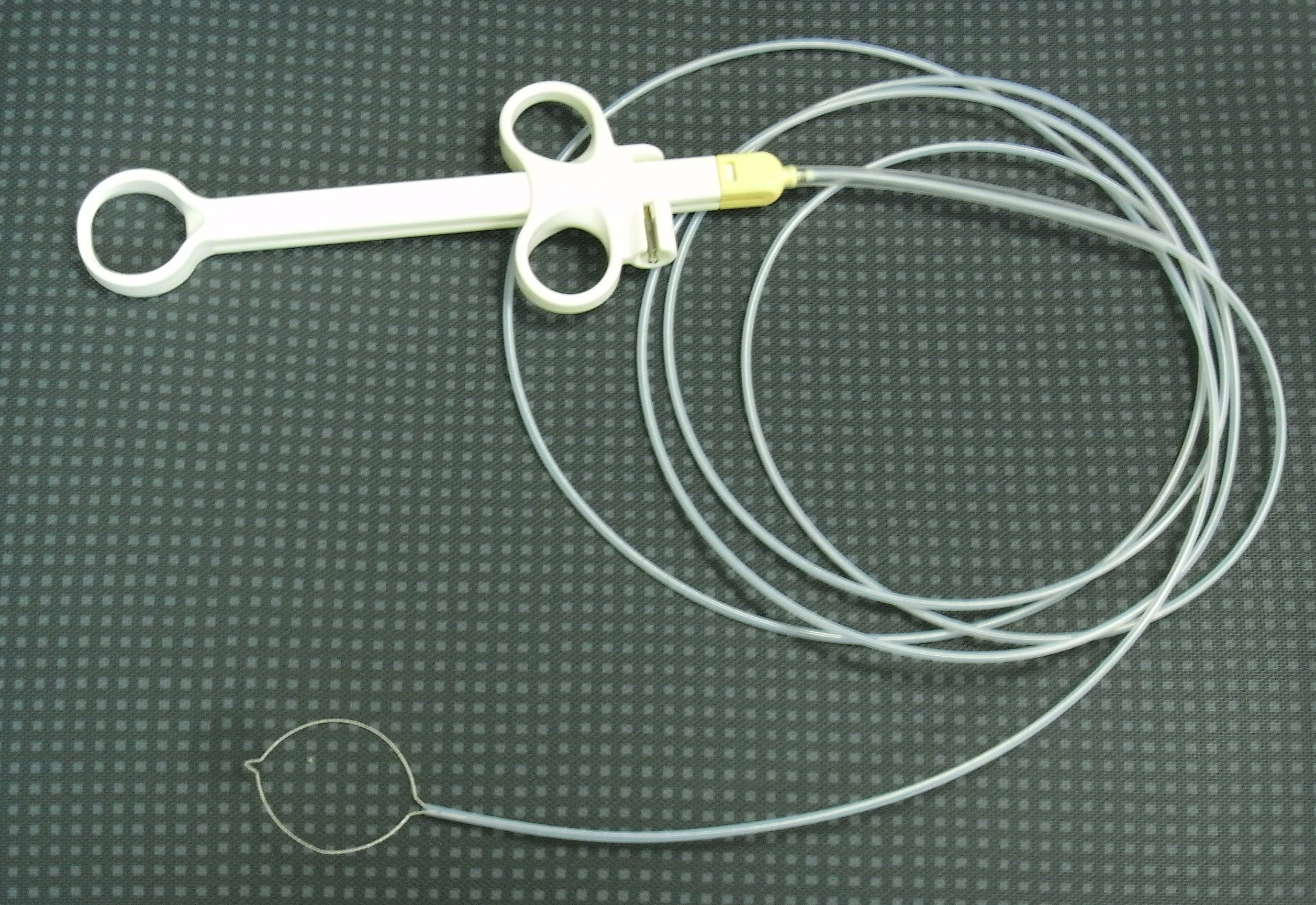
Endoscopy snare used to perform polypectomy

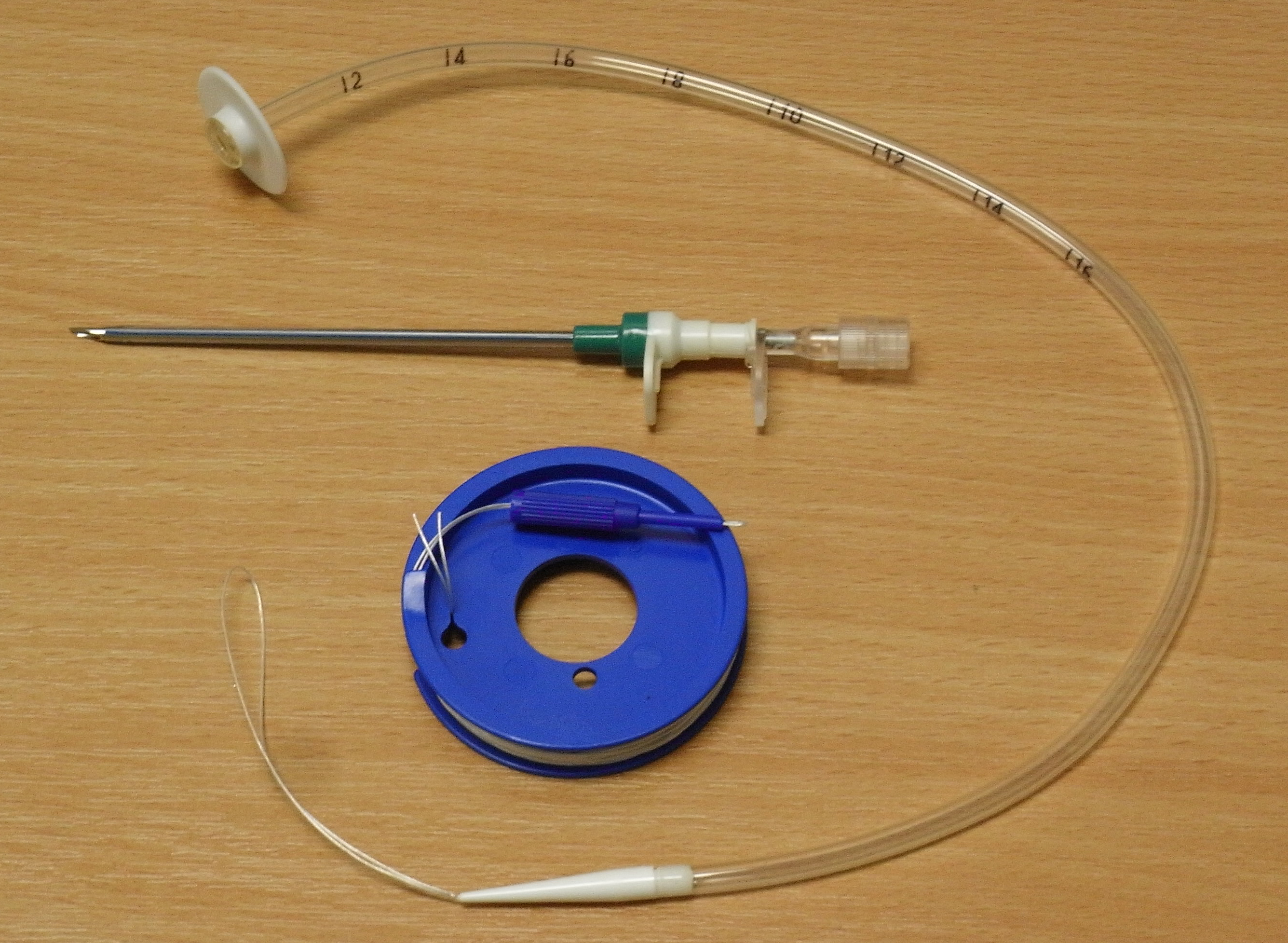
PEG tube
