= John Innes compost =

Formulas for soil-based growing media

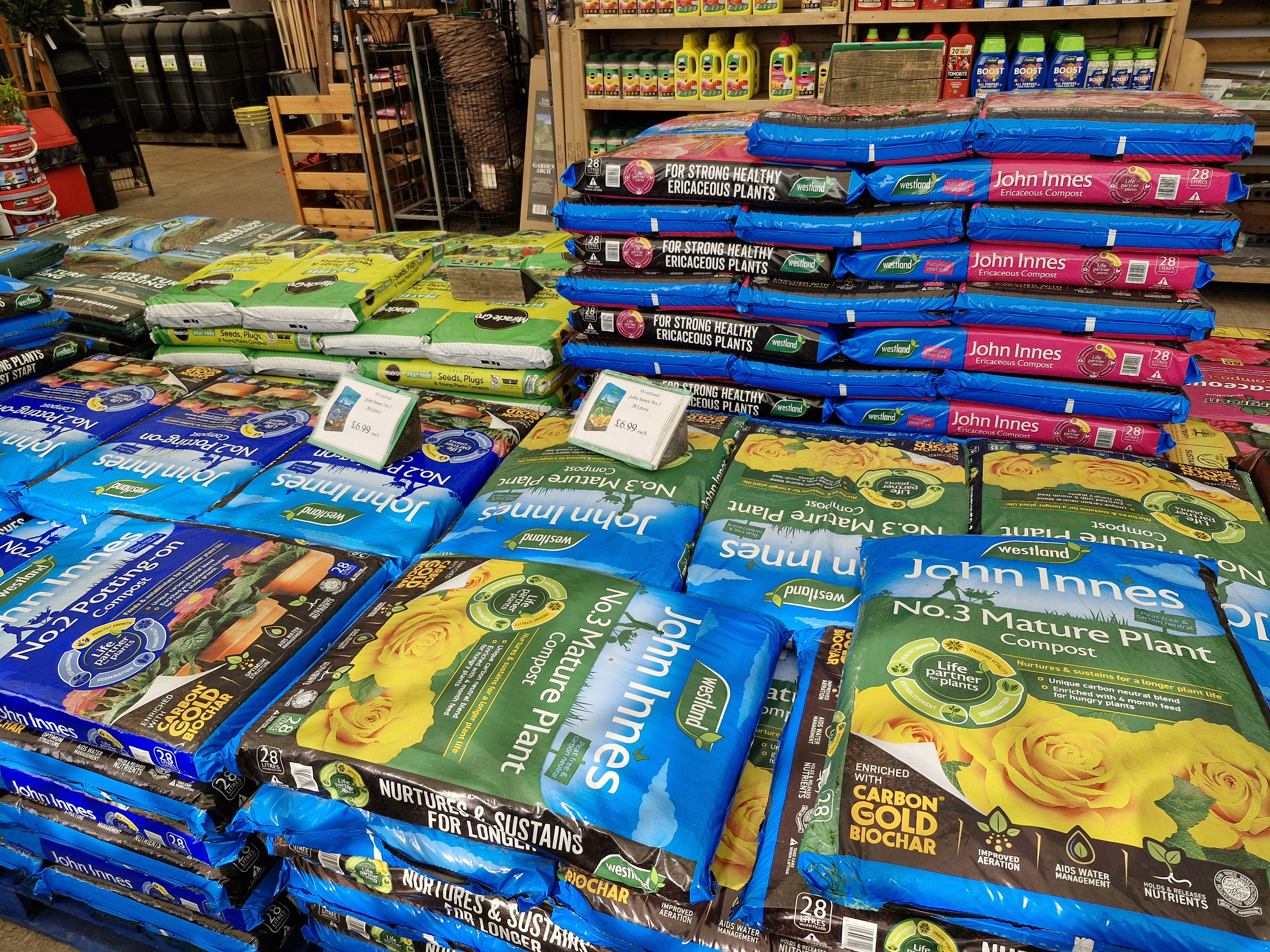
A range of John Innes compost formulae made by Westland Horticulture on sale in an English garden centre.

John Innes compost is a set of four soil-based formulae for growing media, developed at the former John Innes Horticultural Institution (JIHI), now the John Innes Centre, in the 1930s and released into the public domain.

The formulae contain loam, peat, sand, and fertiliser in varying ratios for specific purposes. These composts are used to grow seedlings for planting out, as well as long-lived plants which remain in containers.

== History ==
The scientists who developed the formulae were William Lawrence and John Newell. The pair started to investigate the procedure of making seed and potting composts following heavy losses of Primula sinensis seedlings in the 1933–34 season, which were an important experimental plant for JIHI geneticists.

After hundreds of trials, Lawrence and Newell arrived at their two standardised composts. These formulae were published in 1938, and they became known as "John Innes composts" in the horticultural trade.

The institution made the formulae generally available, but never manufactured the composts for sale nor benefited financially from their production.

== Original formulae ==
There are four original formulae; one seedling mix and three potting mixes. The potting mixes have identical soil components and differ only in nutrient levels.

=== Seedling mix ===
The seedling mix is used to sow seeds and to grow young plants and cuttings until they are ready to be planted out.

The soil component contains:

- 2 parts sterilised loam
- 1 part peat
- 1 part sharp sand

With amendments of:

- 0.6 g/L ground limestone
- 1.2 g/L superphosphate

=== Potting mixes ===
The potting mixes are used to grow different types of plants depending on their nutrient requirements.

All three potting mixes have the same soil component:

- 7 parts sterilised loam
- 3 parts peat
- 2 parts sharp sand

They each contain ground limestone, and varying quantities of the same base fertiliser mix:

- 2 parts hoof and horn
- 2 parts superphosphate
- 1 part sulphate of potash

==== No. 1 ====
No. 1 contains the lowest level of nutrients, and is used for potting on young cuttings or seedlings. The base soil is amended with:

- 0.6 g/L ground limestone
- 3 g/L base fertiliser

==== No. 2 ====
No. 2 contains moderate nutrient levels, and is used for growing established plants and most vegetables. The base soil is amended with:

- 1.2 g/L ground limestone
- 6 g/L base fertiliser

==== No. 3 ====
No. 3 contains the highest nutrient levels, and is used for growing mature plants such as shrubs and trees. The base soil is amended with:

- 1.8 g/L ground limestone
- 9 g/L base fertiliser

== Modern formulae ==
Some new adaptations of the original recipes are also in use.

=== Peat-free alternatives ===
Peat-free John Innes composts may be made by replacing the peat in the recipe with a substitute such as wood fibre, coir, or bark. These substitutes tend to be less acidic than peat, so a smaller quantity of ground limestone is used to balance the pH level.

=== Cutting mix ===
As an alternative to using the original seedling mix, a special mix is sometimes used to root cuttings. The mix contains no added fertiliser or amendments, only the soil component:

- 1 part sterilised loam
- 2 parts peat
- 1 part sharp sand

=== Ericaceous mixes ===
Other mixes have been developed for ericaceous (calcifuge) plants which prefer more acidic soil. These mixes typically omit the ground limestone, and may also have added sulphur.
