= Colney =

Village in Norfolk, England

Coordinates: 52.625353°N 1.221714°E

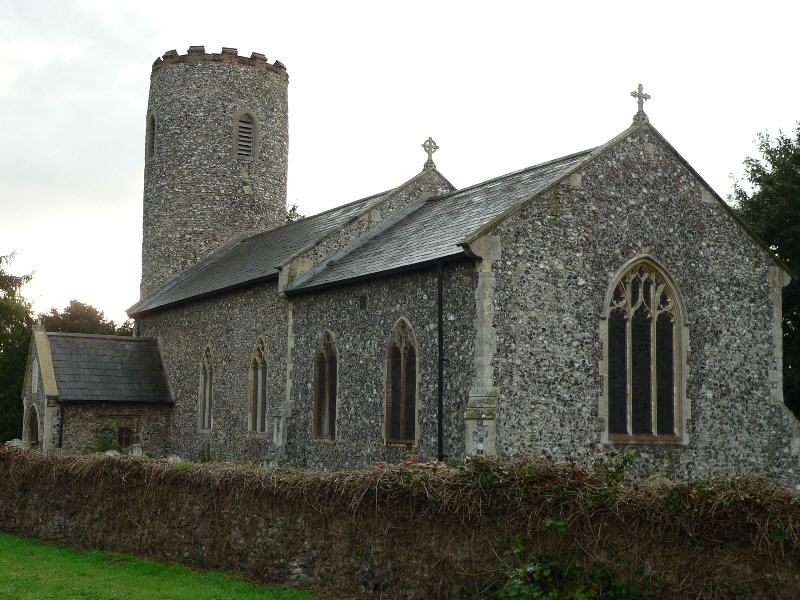
- St. Andrew's Church

- Location within Norfolk
- Area: 3.78 km^{2} (1.46 sq mi)
- Population: 215 (2021)
  - Density: 57/km^{2} (150/sq mi)
- OS grid reference: TG181079
- Civil parish: Colney
- District: South Norfolk
- Shire county: Norfolk
- Region: East
- Country: England
- Sovereign state: United Kingdom
- Post town: NORWICH
- Postcode district: NR4
- Dialling code: 01603
- Police: Norfolk
- Fire: Norfolk
- Ambulance: East of England
- UK Parliament: South Norfolk

Colney (/ˈkoʊni/) is a village in the western outskirts of Norwich in the English county of Norfolk.

Colney is located 2.8 miles (4.5 km) west of Norwich and 6.1 miles (9.8 km) north-east of Wymondham.

In local dialect Colney may be pronounced (/ˈkoʊni/), "Coney", or "Cõ-ney"

== History ==
Colney's name is of Anglo-Saxon origin and derives from the Old English for 'Cola's' island.

Colney is listed in the Domesday Book as a settlement of 34 households in the hundred of Humbleyard. The village was divided between the estates of Roger Bigod, Godric the Steward and William d'Ecouis.

== Geography ==
According to the 2021 census, Colney has a population of 215 people which shows an increase from the 153 people recorded in the 2011 census.

The A47, between Birmingham and Lowestoft, and the B1108, between Carbrooke and Ipswich, both run through the parish.

== St. Andrew's Church ==
Colney's parish church is dedicated to Saint Andrew and dates from the Eleventh Century, being one of Norfolk's remaining round-tower church. St. Andrew's is located on Watton Road and has been Grade II listed since 1959.

St. Andrew's was heavily re-built in the Fourteenth Century and was further restored in the Victorian era. The church boasts a curious memorial to a John Fox who was killed in 1806 in an accident which warns carriage drivers to be careful when driving as well as a late-Medieval font. The church also holds memorials to members of the Barclay family, Cornet William Scott of the Bengal Light Infantry (d.1856) and to a local woman who was killed in the Boxing Day Tsunami.

== Amenities ==
Greenacres Memorial Park is located within the village which is a facility for natural burials, scattering of ashes and a Memorial Hall for the celebration for wakes and wedding receptions. The funeral of TV presenter Caroline Flack took place there in 2020.

The John Innes Centre and Quadram Institute, both parts of the Norfolk and Norwich University Hospital are located within the village.

Norwich City's Lotus Training Ground is located in Colney.

== Governance ==
Claxton is part of the electoral ward of Cringleford for local elections and is part of the district of South Norfolk.

The village's national constituency is South Norfolk which has been represented by the Labour's Ben Goldsborough MP since 2024.

== War memorial ==
Colney's war memorial is located by the side of Old Watton Road and is a granite celtic cross. The memorial lists the following names for the First World War:

Rank	Name	Unit	Date of death	Burial
Lt.	David S. Barclay	1st Bn., Scots Guards	24 Apr. 1917	St. Andrew's Churchyard
LCpl.	Frederick Z. Goldsmith	1st Bn., Border Regiment	19 May 1917	Arras Memorial
Pte.	George S. Heaton MM	11th Bn., Essex Regiment	29 Oct. 1918	Premont Cemetery
Pte.	Donald W. Henning	7th Bn., Norfolk Regiment	20 Jun. 1917	Southern Cemetery, Calais

And, the following for the Second World War:

Rank	Name	Unit	Date of death	Burial
Sgt.	Frederick W. Barrie	No. 199 Squadron RAF	1 Dec. 1943	Runnymede Memorial
Mne.	Frederick Eastwick	Royal Marines	c.1950	Unknown
