= Parr Tate =

Irish parasitologist (1901–1985)

- Tate in 1969
- Born: 27 April 1901; County Cork, Ireland
- Died: 7 November 1985 (aged 84); Cork, County Cork, Ireland
- Education: University College Cork (MSc); Molteno Institute for Research in Parasitology
- Occupation: Parasitologist

Parr Tate (27 April 1901 – 7 November 1985) was an Irish parasitologist, particularly known for his research on malaria. He spent his entire academic career in Cambridge, England, where he was Reader in Parasitology (1949–68) and head of the Department of Parasitology at the University of Cambridge, director of the Molteno Institute for Research in Parasitology (1953–68), and one of the founding fellows of what is now Wolfson College, Cambridge. He was the editor of the journal Parasitology (1952–68).

== Biography ==
Tate was born in County Cork on 27 April 1901. He had severe whooping cough as a child; this required him to be educated at home and resulted in asthma, from which he never recovered. As a child he bred canaries, winning prizes with them at shows; Malcolm Peaker suggests this might have contributed to his asthma. In 1920, Tate went up to University College, Cork, of the National University of Ireland, where he graduated in zoology and botany (1923) and then gained an MSc (1924).

In 1924, after being awarded a Travelling Scholarship, he moved to Cambridge to study for a PhD at the Molteno Institute for Research in Parasitology under the supervision of George H. F. Nuttall; he spent the rest of his career there. In 1949, Tate was appointed Reader in Parasitology, and in 1953, succeeded David Keilin as the director of the Molteno Institute, remaining in the position until his retirement in September 1968. He was also head of the university's Department of Parasitology. Tate served as editor of the journal Parasitology from 1952 to 1968 (with Keilin until his death in 1963). In 1965, he was one of the founding fellows of University College (now Wolfson College).

He was interested in natural history, and for three decades, visited Kettlewell in the Yorkshire Dales during the summer vacation, with the biochemist Malcolm Dixon and his sister, Lilian Tate. In retirement, he continued to keep a house in Cambridge but spent part of his time with Lilian in Cork. He died in Cork on 7 November 1985.

== Research ==
Tate's earliest research was on respiratory enzymes in the fungi that cause ringworm.

His best-known research was on malaria. Towards the end of the 1920s, he started to work on avian malaria, using his expertise in canaries to develop the only British laboratory method for testing antimalarial drugs, using the model system of Plasmodium relictum in canaries, in association with M. Vincent and later Ann Bishop. In the mid-1930s, Tate turned to the newly isolated Plasmodium gallinaceum, which infects chickens, at first continuing to test antimalarials; this line of research was continued by Bishop. In 1937–38, with Sydney Price James, using chickens infected with P. gallinaceum sporozoites, Tate demonstrated a novel Plasmodium life-cycle stage outside red blood cells in which the parasite infects endothelial cells, particularly in the brain. The finding undermined the long-held view that Plasmodium sporozoites infected red blood cells directly, and was later replicated in primates by Henry Shortt and Cyril Garnham.

His other research was wide ranging, including work on other protozoa and on flies and mosquitos.

== Key research papers ==
- S. P. James, P. Tate (1937). New knowledge of the life cycle of malaria parasites. Nature 139: 545–46
- S. P. James, P. Tate (1938). Exo-erythrocytic schizogony in Plasmodium gallinaceum Brumpt, 1935. Parasitology 30: 128–39 doi:10.1017/S0031182000010891
