= Frederick James Quick =

Frederick James Quick (22 October 1836 — 21 December 1902) was a wholesale dealer in tea and coffee in the City of London, chairman of the firm Quick, Reek, and Smith.

He left most of his fortune to the University of Cambridge to promote the interests of biology and botany, which led to the establishment in 1906 of the Quick Chair in Biology.

== Early life ==
Quick was born in London in 1836, the second son of James Carthew Quick, a wholesale coffee dealer, and was baptized at St Giles's, Camberwell, on 18 November. He was educated at Harrow School, from 1851 to 1855, and then at Trinity Hall, Cambridge, where he arrived in October 1855 and graduated Bachelor of Arts on 29 January 1859. He then studied for the Bar at the Inns of Court and was admitted as a barrister. Finally, he learned farming at St Andrews, and his father bought land for him at Woodmancote, West Sussex.

Quick's older brother, Robert Hebert Quick (1832–1891), was also educated at Harrow and Cambridge. In 1855, he was ordained as a Church of England clergyman and became a schoolmaster, leaving his younger brother to follow the path of trade.

== Career ==
Quick was briefly a partner in a wholesale tea business. In 1869, he was made a partner in the firm of Quick, Reek, and Smith, which had been founded by his father. In 1881, he was occupying a room at 10 Beaufort Buildings, St Clement Danes, a set of barristers’ rooms known as Beaufort chambers. By that year, James Carthew Quick had been widowed and had retired to Brighton, where he was joined by a number of cousins and by his unmarried younger son, who in that year stated his occupation as wholesale coffee dealer. J. C. Quick died in 1884 and left an estate valued at £48,548, with his two sons acting as his Executors. Becoming senior partner in the family firm, Quick remained in office until his death in 1902. In his business affairs, Quick was far-seeing and shrewd and a good judge of character.

Quick was a friend of the artist and architect James Edward Rogers and in 1896 acted as an executor of his friend's will.

== Private life, death, and bequests ==
Quick never married, and his brother died before him. At the time of the 1901 United Kingdom census, he was living at Eltham, Kent, now part of the Royal Borough of Greenwich, with two servants, a housekeeper and a housemaid, and stated his occupation as barrister.

In 1902, Quick died at home in Eltham, leaving an estate valued for probate at £70,453, equivalent to £9,555,999 in 2023. He had suffered from a horror of being buried alive, and not long before his death he had asked one of the Executors of his will, J. W. Williams, to arrange for a surgeon to probe his heart and make sure he was dead. He also left instructions for his remains to be cremated, and these wishes were carried out, with his ashes being buried at the Broadwood Cemetery.

Quick had been greatly interested in biology and botany, and this led him to decide to use his wealth to endow the Frederick James Quick Fund, as "a permanent fund for the promotion of Study and Research in the Sciences of Vegetable and Animal Biology" in the University of Cambridge. Inheriting the residue of Quick's estate, the Fund gained about £50,000 when the estate was settled early in 1903. The university used the Fund to establish a new Quick Professorship of Biology, with a focus on the field of protozoology, and with George Nuttall being appointed as the first professor in 1906. The full benefit of the bequest was delayed until some life-interests had expired, and at first Nuttall found temporary rooms in the new Cambridge Medical School building, where he established a Quick Laboratory. Later, a purpose-built laboratory was provided.

Quick’s brother married Bertha Parr, a daughter of Thomas Chase Parr. Their children included Oliver Chase Quick, (1885–1944), a theologian who became Regius Professor of Divinity at Oxford.
