= Stephen Jackson (biologist) =

British biologist

Sir Stephen Jackson
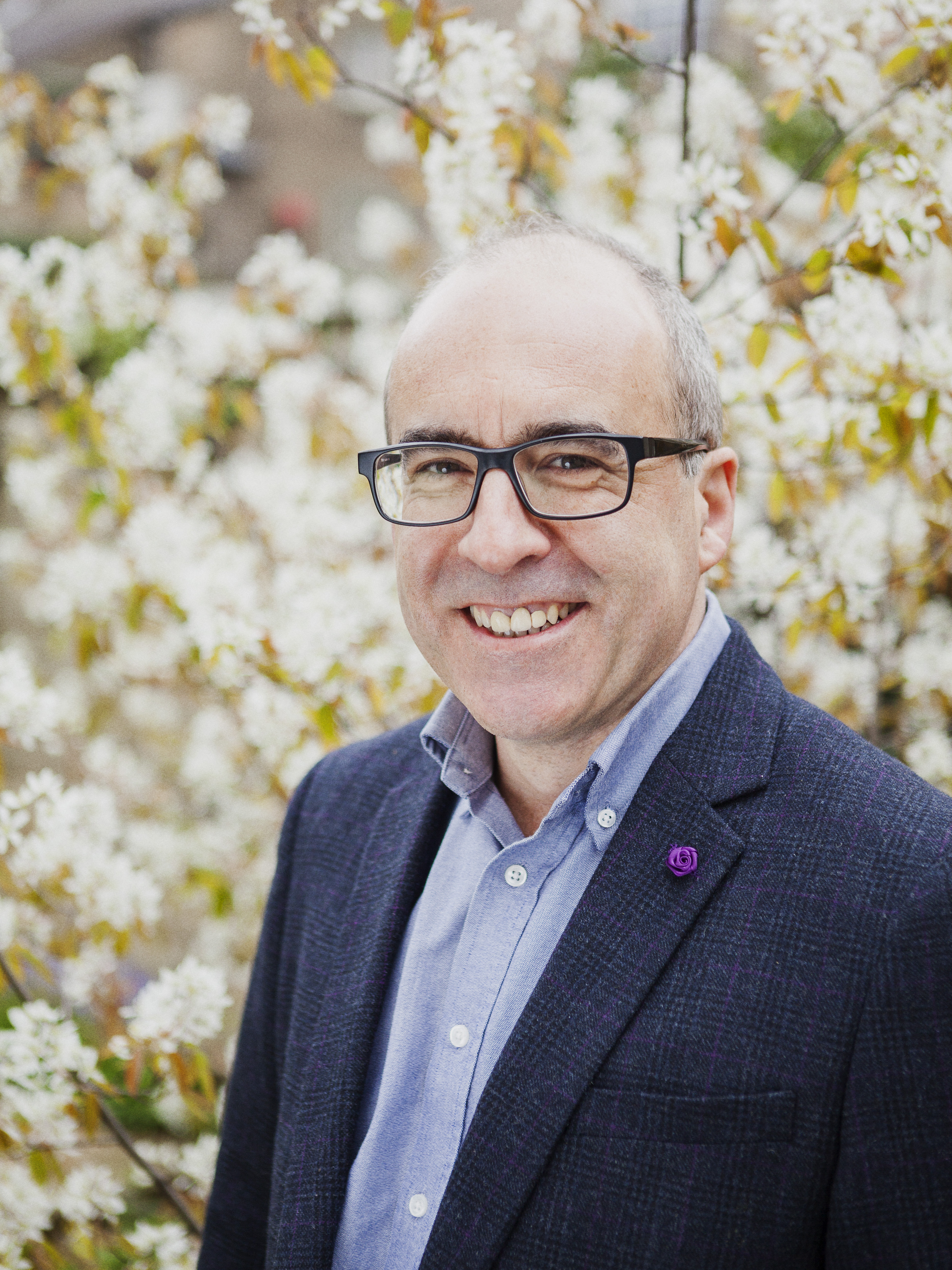
- Born: Stephen Philip Jackson; 17 July 1962 (age 64); Nottingham, England
- Education: University of Leeds (BSc); Imperial College London (PhD); University of Edinburgh (PhD)
- Known for: Understanding cellular responses to DNA damage and their relevance to cancer
- Awards: EMBO member (1997); Fellow of the Royal Society (2008); FMedSci (2001); Buchanan Medal (2011); King Faisal International Prize (2016); Dr. A.H. Heineken Prize for Medicine (2016); Leopold Griffuel Prize (2019)
- Scientific career
- Fields: Cancer; DNA repair Cell biology Molecular biology
- Workplaces: University of Cambridge; University of California, Berkeley; University of Edinburgh
- Thesis: Cloning and characterisation of the RNA8 gene of Saccharomyces cerevisiae (1987)
- Doctoral advisor: Jean Beggs
- Website: www.cruk.cam.ac.uk/research-groups/jackson-group www.stevejacksonlab.org

Sir Stephen Philip Jackson (born 17 July 1962) is a British biologist who is the Frederick James Quick Professor of Biology. He is a senior group leader at the Cancer Research UK Cambridge Institute and associate group leader at the Gurdon Institute, University of Cambridge.

== Education ==
Jackson was educated at the University of Leeds, graduating with a Bachelor of Science degree in biochemistry in 1983. He then carried out his PhD research working with Jean Beggs on yeast RNA splicing at Imperial College London and Edinburgh University, earning his PhD in 1987.

== Research ==
Following his PhD, Jackson carried out postdoctoral research with Robert Tjian at the University of California, Berkeley, where he developed an interest in the regulation of transcription. He returned to the UK in 1991 as a Junior Group Leader at the then Wellcome-CRC Institute, now the Gurdon Institute.

Jackson's work has provided key insights into cellular processes that respond to DNA damage; processes fundamental to life and whose defects cause various diseases particularly cancer. Through his discovery that the DNA-dependent protein kinase (DNA-PK) enzyme is activated by DNA double-strand breaks (DSBs), Jackson's laboratory identified and characterised various components of the non-homologous end joining (NHEJ) system that repairs most DSBs in human cells. These studies also provided a paradigm for Jackson's later work on DNA-damage signalling by the ATM serine/threonine kinase and ATR (Ataxia telangiectasia and Rad3 related), and his studies on how these and additional DNA repair factors interact with and influence one another, often in ways regulated by post-translational modifications. Jackson's work has also helped establish how DSB repair is controlled during the cell cycle, at telomeres in response to cell aging/senescence, and within chromatin.

In 1997 Jackson founded KuDOS Pharmaceuticals with the aim of translating knowledge of DNA damage response pathways into new treatments for cancer. KuDOS developed small-molecule inhibitors of several DNA damage response enzymes. The most advanced of these is the poly (ADP-ribose) polymerase 1 (PARP1) inhibitor Olaparib/Lynparza™, which is now a registered medicine worldwide. KuDOS developed into a fully integrated drug-discovery and drug-development company and was acquired by AstraZeneca in 2005.

In 2011 Jackson founded MISSION Therapeutics a firm to develop drugs to improve the management of life-threatening diseases, particularly cancer. In 2017, he founded Adrestia Therapeutics Ltd and currently serves as Chief Scientific Officer.

=== Paper retractions ===
In 2018, Jackson's former postdoctoral scholar, Abderrahmane Kaidi, then working at the University of Bristol was found guilty of research fraud. Kaidi additionally confessed that he had made false data in two of his research papers published with Jackson. Bristol conveyed the matter to the University of Cambridge which took up an investigation.

On 19 August 2018, Cambridge and Jackson informed Science that the paper published in 2010 was investigated for research misconduct. The journal issued an expression of concern over the article the next month. Cambridge made its final decision in April 2019 that the paper in Science and another in Nature (in 2013) contain fabricated data that were done by Kaidi. Jackson was not involved in the misdeed. The two journals simultaneously retracted the papers on 11 April 2019.

In 2024 further evidence of scientific fraud was identified and another paper from Jackson's laboratory was retracted. This time the first author was Abdeladim Moumen, and the paper 'hnRNP K: An HDM2 Target and Transcriptional Coactivator of p53 in Response to DNA Damage' was retracted from Cell.

== Honours and awards ==
Jackson has received numerous awards, medals and honorary degrees: the inaugural Eppendorf-Nature European Young Investigator Award (1995); the Tenovus Medal for Cancer Research (1997); the Colworth Medal (1997); the Anthony Dipple Carcinogenesis Young Investigator award (2002); the Biochemical Society GlaxoSmithKline Award (2008); the BBSRC Innovator of the Year Award (2009); the Royal Society Buchanan Medal (2011), the latter in recognition of his "outstanding contributions to understanding DNA repair and DNA damage response signalling pathways", and the Gagna A. & Ch. Van Heck Prize (2015) for "his cardinal contributions related to cellular events that detect, signal the presence of and repair DNA damages".

Jackson is the co-winner of the King Faisal International Prize for Science 2016, in recognition of his "outstanding contribution to defining the link between the basic mechanism of genomic DNA instability and its relationship to cancer. Specifically, he unraveled the salient components of the pathway involved in DNA repair. He is also credited with an innovative approach to bring his findings into tangible therapeutic products to treat cancer". He was elected a member of the European Molecular Biology Organization (EMBO) in 1997, a Fellow of the Academy of Medical Sciences in 2001 and a Fellow of the Royal Society in 2008.

In 2016, Jackson was awarded the Dr A. H. Heineken Prize for Medicine for his "fundamental research into DNA repair in human cells and for the successful application of knowledge of that process in the development of new cancer drugs". In 2017 he was awarded the Genome Stability Network medal for his contributions to the field of genome stability and particularly for the realisation of the therapeutic potential of targeting the DDR.

The Fondation ARC's Leopold Griffuel Prize in Translational and Clinical Research was presented to Jackson in 2019 for his work on DNA damage repair and his role in the development of medicines such as PARP1 and 2 inhibitors, currently used for cancer treatment. In 2020, he was awarded the Royal Society's Mullard Award for his research on DNA repair mechanisms and synthetic lethality that led to the discovery of olaparib which has reached blockbuster status for the treatment of ovarian and breast cancers.

In 2022, Jackson was awarded the Johann Anton Merck Award, which is given for outstanding scientific preclinical research accomplishments in the areas of Merck Healthcare‘s strategic focus. Cancer Research UK honoured Steve with Cancer Research Horizon's Entrepreneurship Recognition Award in recognition of his longstanding academic entrepreneurship and his outstanding contributions that have enhanced the field of oncology.

Jackson was knighted in the 2023 Birthday Honours for services to innovation and research.
