= Bob Quick =

Bob Quick may refer to:

- Bob Quick (basketball) (born 1946), American basketball player
- Bob Quick (police officer) (born 1959), British police officer
- Robert Hebert Quick (1831–1891), English educator and writer
