= Ann Bishop (biologist) =

British biologist

- Born: 19 December 1899; Manchester, England
- Died: 7 May 1990 (aged 90); Cambridge, England
- Education: Manchester University, Cambridge University
- Known for: Studies of drug resistance in Plasmodium
- Scientific career
- Fields: Biology, protozoology, parasitology
- Institutions: Girton College, Cambridge
- Thesis: (1926)

Ann Bishop (19 December 1899 – 7 May 1990) was a British biologist from Girton College at the University of Cambridge and a Fellow of the Royal Society, one of the few female Fellows of the Royal Society. She was born in Manchester but stayed at Cambridge for the vast majority of her professional life. Her specialties were protozoology and parasitology; early work with ciliate parasites, including the one responsible for blackhead disease in the domesticated turkey, lay the groundwork for her later research. While working towards her doctorate, Bishop studied parasitic amoebae and examined potential chemotherapies for the treatment of amoebic diseases including amoebic dysentery.

Her best known work was a comprehensive study of Plasmodium, the malaria parasite, and investigation of various chemotherapies for the disease. Later she studied drug resistance in this parasite, research that proved valuable to the British military in World War II. She discovered the potential for cross-resistance in these parasites during that same period. Bishop also discovered the protozoan Pseudotrichomonas keilini and worked with Aedes aegypti, a malaria vector, as part of her research on the disease. Elected to the Royal Society in 1959, Bishop was the founder of the British Society for Parasitology and served on the World Health Organization's Malaria Committee.

== Life ==
Bishop was born in Manchester, England on 19 December 1899. Her father, James Kimberly Bishop, was a furniture-maker who owned a cotton factory inherited from his father. Her mother, Ellen Bishop (née Ginger), was from Bedfordshire. Bishop had one brother, born when she was 13. At an early age, Bishop wished to continue the family business, though her interests quickly turned to the sciences after her father encouraged her to go to university. Appreciative of music from a young age, Bishop regularly attended performances of the Halle Orchestra in Manchester. As a researcher, she was introverted and meticulous, preferring to work alone or with other scientists whom she considered to have high standards. She was a fixture at Girton College for most of her life; The Guardian dubbed her "Girtonian of Girtonians" in her obituary. A keen cook, she was also known for her annoyance at the lack of scientific measures in recipes she found.

Bishop was recognised at the college for her distinctive hats, which she would wear to breakfast every day before walking to the Molteno Institute, a distance of 3.5 miles (5.6 km). She was skilled in needlework and appreciated the arts, though she did not like modern art. Her pastimes included walking and travelling, especially in the Lake District: however, she rarely left Britain. She also spent time in London at the beginning of each year, attending the opera and ballet and visiting galleries. Towards the end of her life, when her mobility was limited by arthritis, Bishop developed a fascination with the history of biology and medicine, although she never published in that field. Ann Bishop died of pneumonia at the age of 90 after a short illness. Her memorial service was conducted in the college's chapel and was filled with her wide circle of friends.

== Education ==
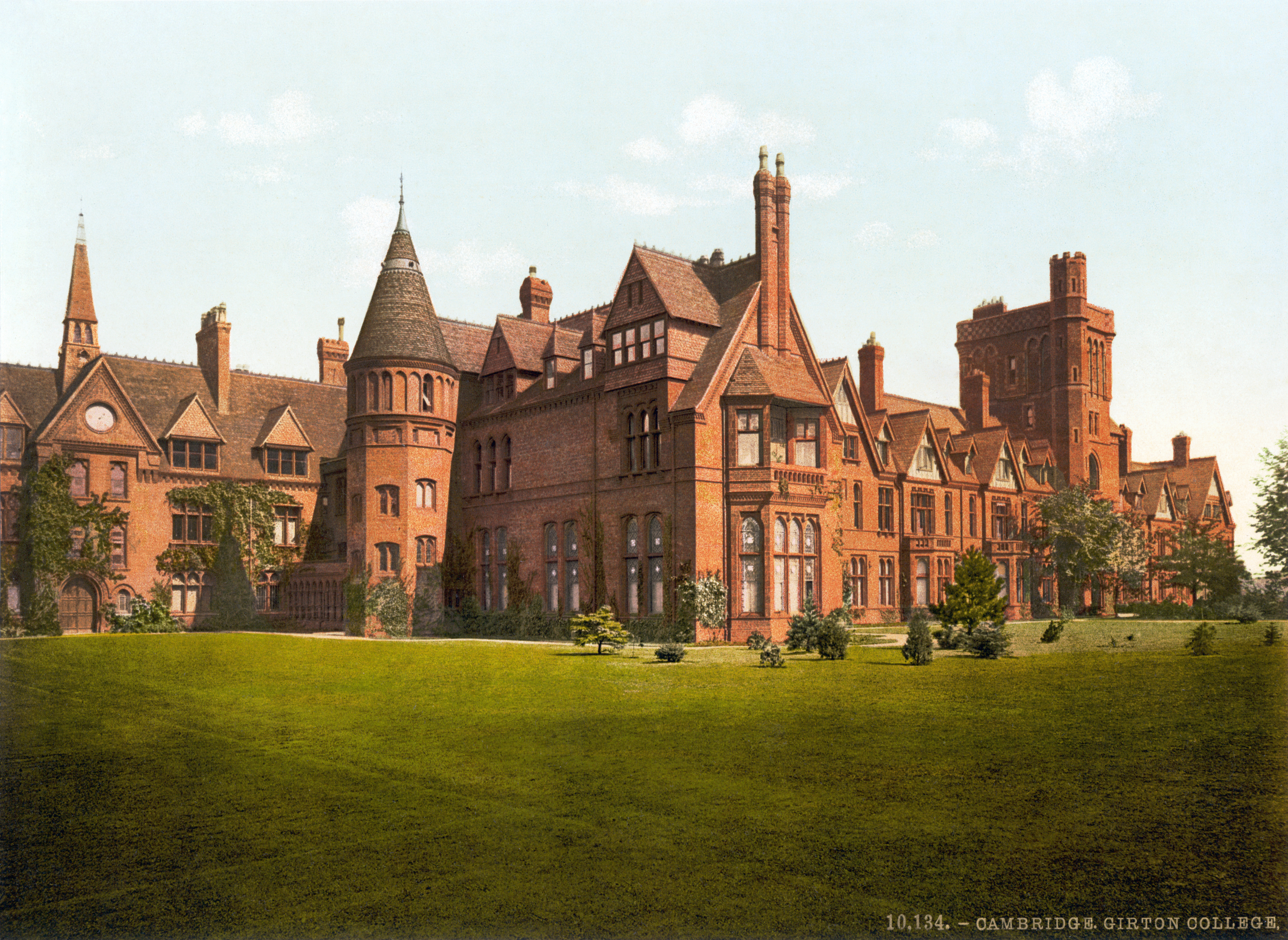
Girton College, Bishop's alma mater, approximately 30 years before she attended

Educated at home until she was seven, Bishop then went to a private elementary school until the age of nine. In 1909, then ten years old, she entered the progressive Fielden School in her hometown of Manchester, where she studied for three years. She completed her high school education at the Manchester High School for Girls. Though Bishop intended to study chemistry, her lack of education in physics meant that she could not pursue her preferred course in the Honours School of Chemistry. Instead, she matriculated at Manchester University in October 1918 to study botany, chemistry, and zoology. That first-year course in zoology sparked her lifelong interest in and commitment to the field. She graduated with honours from the School of Zoology, receiving her Bachelor of Science degree in 1921; she received her master's degree in 1922. During her undergraduate years, under the tutelage of the helminthologist R.A. Wardle and the protozoologist Geoffrey Lapage, Bishop studied ciliates acquired from local ponds.

Two years into her undergraduate career, after winning the John Dalton Natural History Prize awarded by the university, she began work for another protozoologist, a Fellow of the Royal Society, Sydney J. Hickson. In 1932, she received her D.Sc. from Manchester University, for her work with the blackhead parasite. She received her Sc.D. from the University of Cambridge in 1941, though it was in title only: women were not granted full degrees from Cambridge at this time.

== Scientific career ==
=== Early work ===
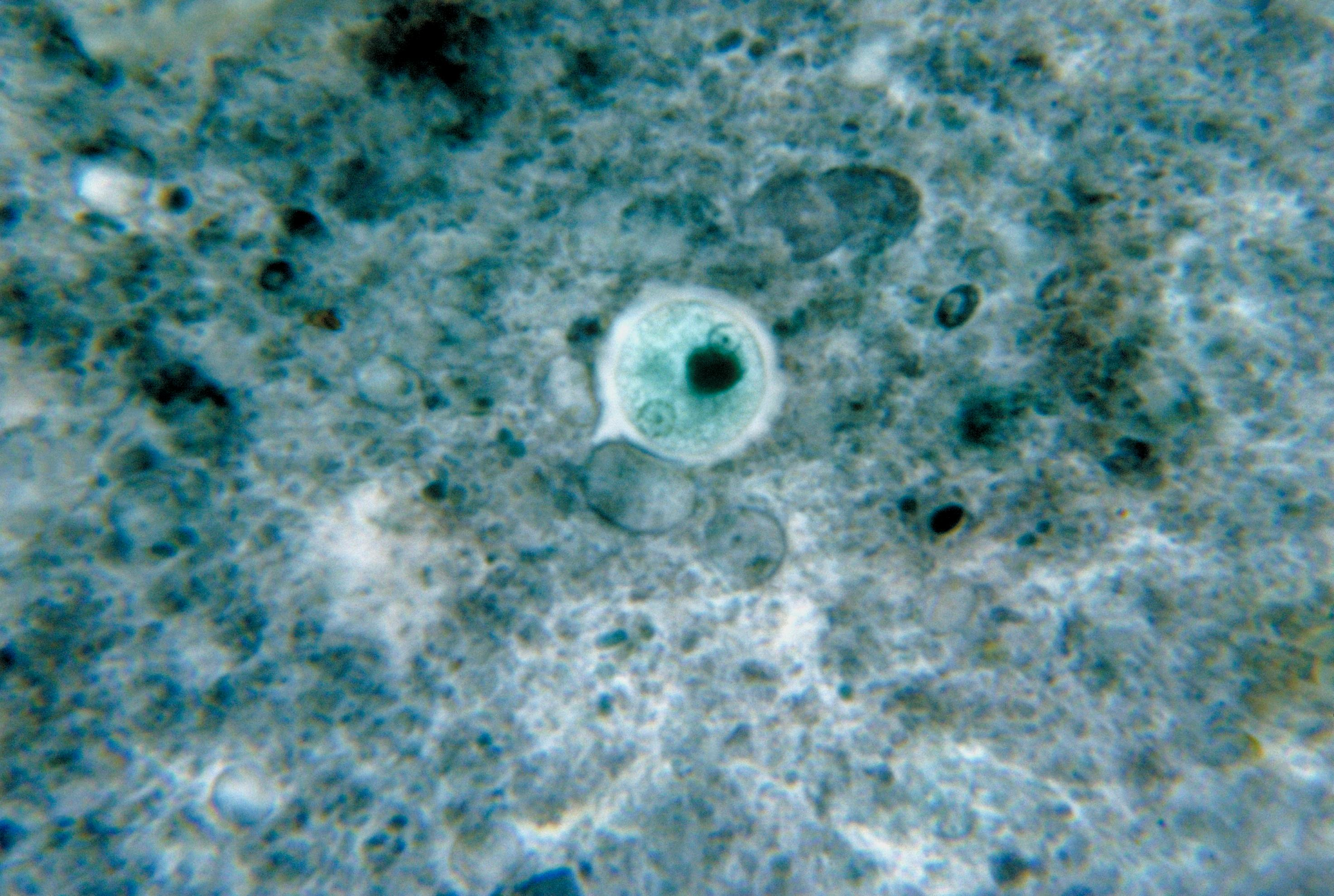
An Entamoeba histolytica cyst, the subject of Bishop's early work

Bishop's undergraduate work with Hickson was her first major research effort, concerning the reproduction of Spirostomum ambiguum, a large ciliate that has been described as "wormlike". In 1923, while working at Manchester University, Bishop was appointed an honorary research fellow. In 1924, she became a part-time instructor for the Department of Zoology at Cambridge, one of only two women, both of whom were sometimes marginalised. For example, she was not allowed to sit at the table with the men of the department at tea: instead, she sat on a first-aid kit. There, Bishop continued her work with Spirostomum as the only protozoologist on the faculty.

She left that position in 1926, to work for Clifford Dobell at the National Institute for Medical Research where she stayed there for three years. Under Dobell, Bishop studied parasitic amoebae found in the human gastrointestinal tract, focusing on the species responsible for amoebic dysentery, Entamoeba histolytica. Dobell, Bishop, and Patrick Laidlaw studied the effects of amoebicides like emetine for the purpose of treating amoebal diseases. Later in her career, she named the amoeba genus Dobellina after her mentor.

=== Molteno Institute ===
The majority of her career was spent at Cambridge's Molteno Institute for Parasite Biology, where she returned in 1929. Her work there was an extension of her research with Dobell, as she studied nuclear division in parasitic flagellates and amoebae of diverse species, including both vertebrates and invertebrates. She isolated one type of protozoan, aerotolerant anaerobes, from the digestive tract of Haemopis sanguisuga during this period. Bishop also discovered a new species, Pseudotrichomonas keilini, which she named to acknowledge her colleague David Keilin, as well as the parasite's resemblance to the genus Trichomonas. Her research at Manchester with H.P. Baynon concerned the identification, isolation, and study of the turkey blackhead parasite (Histomonas meleagridis); this study pioneered a technique for isolating and growing parasites from lesions on the liver. Bishop and Baynon were the first scientists to isolate Histomonas and then prove its role in blackhead. Bishop's expertise with parasitic protozoa translated into her best-known work, a comprehensive study of the malaria parasite (Plasmodium) and potential chemotherapies for the disease.

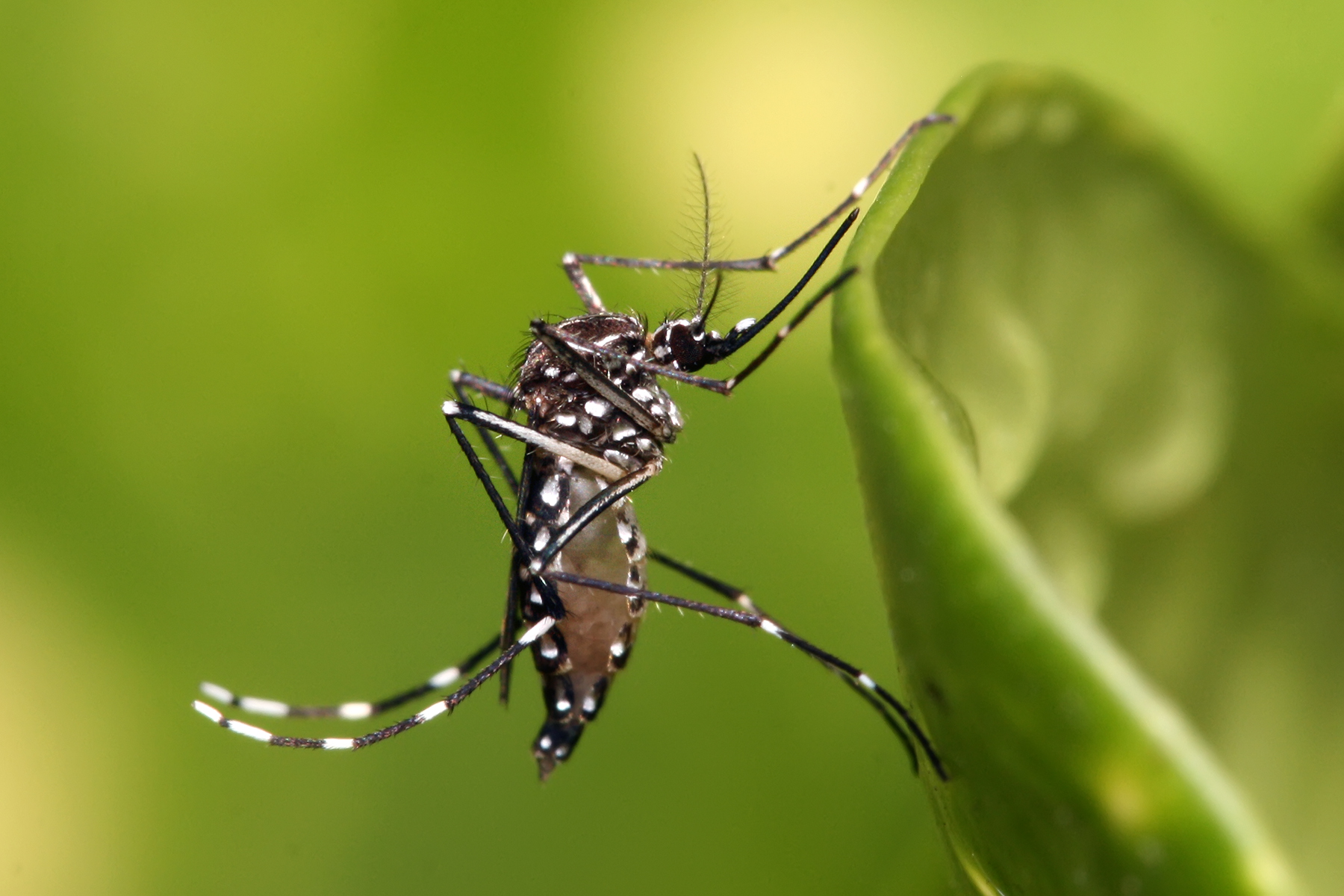
Aedes aegypti, a malaria vector

Between 1937 and 1938, Bishop studied the effects of various factors, including different substances in blood and different temperatures, on the feeding behaviour of the chicken malaria (Plasmodium gallinaceum) vector, Aedes aegypti. She also examined factors that contributed to Plasmodium reproduction. This work became the basis for subsequent ongoing research into a malaria vaccine. Her subsequent work was spurred by the outbreak of the Second World War. During the war, she investigated alternative chemotherapies for malaria. Her research aided the British war effort because the most prevalent antimalarial, quinine, was difficult to obtain due to the Japanese occupation of the Dutch West Indies. From 1947 to 1964, she was in charge of the Institute's Chemotherapy Research Institute, associated with the Medical Research Council.

Bishop's work evolved to include studies of drug resistance in both the parasites and the host organisms, the studies that would earn her a place in the Royal Society. Significant work from this period of Bishop's life included a study showing that the parasite itself did not develop resistance to quinine, but that host organisms could develop resistance to the drug proguanil. Her in vitro research was proven accurate when the drugs she studied were used to treat patients who had tertian malaria, a form of the illness in which the paroxysm of fever occurs every third day. She also investigated the drugs pamaquine and atebrin, along with proguanil, though proguanil was the only one shown to cause the development of drug resistance. Other studies showed that malaria parasites could develop cross-resistance to other antimalarial drugs. Bishop worked at Molteno until 1967. Her research and experimental protocols were later used in rodent and human studies, albeit with modifications.

=== Honours and legacy ===
Bishop received several honorary titles and fellowships during her career. In 1932, she was appointed a Yallow Fellow of Girton College, an honour she held until her death in 1990. Bishop was also a Beit Fellow from 1929 to 1932. The Medical Research Council awarded her a grant in 1937 that sparked her study of Plasmodium. In 1945 and 1947, she was involved in organising Girton College's Working Women's Summer School, an institution designed to provide intellectual fulfilment for women whose formal education ended at the age of 14. She was elected to the Royal Society in 1959, and at one point was a member of the Malaria Committee of the World Health Organization.

The British Society for Parasitology was founded in the 1950s, largely due to Bishop's efforts. She was initially given only five pounds and a secretary to start the Society; to raise funds Bishop passed around a pudding basin at the Society's meetings. The society was originally a subgroup of the Institute of Biology at Cambridge, but it became an independent group in 1960 and was headed by Bishop. She was the president of the group, called the Institute of Biology Parasitology Group, from 1960 to 1962, the third overall leader of the group. Later that decade, the Department of Biology asked her to be the department head, but she declined because of the public nature of the role. For 20 years, the scientific journal Parasitology had Bishop on staff as an editor. Her lifelong association with Girton College prompted the placement of a plaque commemorating her life, whose inscription, quoted from Virgil, reads "Felix, qui potuit rerum cognoscere causas", Latin for "Happy is the one who has been able to get to know the causes of things". In 1992, the British Society for Parasitology created a grant in Bishop's name, the Ann Bishop Travelling Award, to aid young parasitologists in travelling for field work where their parasites of interest are endemic.

== Selected publications ==
- Bishop, Ann (1923). "Some observations upon Spirostomum ambiguum (Ehrenberg)" (PDF). Quarterly Journal of the Microscopical Society. 67: 391–434.
- Bishop, Ann (1927). "The cytoplasmic structures of Spirostomum ambiguum (Ehrenberg)" (PDF). Quarterly Journal of the Microscopical Society. 71: 147–172.
- Laidlaw, P. P.; Dobell, Clifford; Bishop, Ann (1928). "Further experiments on the action of emetine in cultures of Entamoeba histolytica". Parasitology. 20 (2): 207–220. doi:10.1017/S0031182000011604. S2CID 84208051.
- Bishop, Ann; Dobell, Clifford (1929). "Researches on the intestinal protozoa of monkeys and man. III: The action of emetine on natural amoebic infections in Macaques". Parasitology. 21 (4): 446–468. doi:10.1017/S0031182000029334. S2CID 251058445.
- Bishop, Ann (1929). "Experiments on the action of emetine in cultures of Entamoeba coli". Parasitology. 21 (4): 481–486. doi:10.1017/S003118200002936X. S2CID 86206309.
- Bishop, Ann (1931). "The morphology and division of Trichomonas". Parasitology. 23 (2): 129–156. doi:10.1017/S0031182000013524. S2CID 86130751.
- Bishop, Ann (1938). "Histomonas meleagridis in domestic fowls (Gallus gallus). Cultivation and experimental infection". Parasitology. 30 (2): 181–194. doi:10.1017/S0031182000025749. S2CID 86700000.
- Bishop, Ann (1942). "Chemotherapy and avian malaria". Parasitology. 34 (1): 1–54. doi:10.1017/S0031182000015985. S2CID 85322825.
- Bishop, Ann; Gilchrist, Barbara M. (1946). "Experiments upon the feeding of Aëdes aegypti through animal membranes with a view to applying this method to the chemotherapy of malaria". Parasitology. 37 (1–2): 85–100. doi:10.1017/S0031182000013202. PMID 21014255. S2CID 9141202.
- Bishop, Ann; Birkett, Betty (1947). "Acquired resistance to paludrine in Plasmodium gallinaceum". Nature. 159 (4052): 884–885. Bibcode:1947Natur.159..884B. doi:10.1038/159884a0. PMID 20252559. S2CID 4066589.
- Bishop, Ann; Birkett, Betty (1948). "Drug-resistance in Plasmodium gallinaceum, and the persistence of paludrine-resistance after mosquito transmission". Parasitology. 39 (1–2): 125–137. doi:10.1017/S0031182000083657. PMID 18876887. S2CID 46434407.
- Bishop, Ann; McConnachie, Elspeth W. (1948). "Resistance to sulphadiazine and 'paludrine' in the malaria parasite of the fowl (p. Gallinaceum)". Nature. 162 (4118): 541–543. Bibcode:1948Natur.162..541B. doi:10.1038/162541a0. PMID 18884622. S2CID 4072559.
- Bishop, Ann; McConnachie, Elspeth W. (1950). "Sulphadiazine-resistance in Plasmodium gallinaceum and its relation to other antimalarial compounds". Parasitology. 40 (1–2): 163–174. doi:10.1017/S0031182000017996. PMID 15401181. S2CID 28825962.
- Bishop, Ann (1955). "Problems concerned with gametogenesis in Haemosporidiidea, with particular reference to the genus Plasmodium". Parasitology. 45 (1–2): 163–185. doi:10.1017/S0031182000027542. PMID 14370842. S2CID 1687589.
- Bishop, Ann; McConnachie, Elspeth W. (1956). "A study of the factors affecting the emergence of the gametocytes of Plasmodium gallinaceum from the erythrocytes and the exflagellation of the male gametocytes". Parasitology. 46 (1–2): 192–215. doi:10.1017/S0031182000026433. PMID 13322465. S2CID 1368901.
- Bishop, Ann (1959). "Drug resistance in protozoa". Biological Reviews. 34 (4): 334–500. doi:10.1111/j.1469-185X.1959.tb01317.x. S2CID 86366224.
