= Gnotobiosis =

Organism with fully-known microorganisms

Gnotobiosis (from Greek roots gnostos "known" and bios "life") refers to an engineered state of an organism in which all forms of life (i.e., microorganisms) in or on it, including its microbiota, have been identified. The term gnotobiotic organism, or gnotobiote, can refer to a model organism that is colonized with a specific community of known microorganisms (isobiotic or defined flora animal) or that contains no microorganisms (germ-free) often for experimental purposes. The study of gnotobiosis and the generation of various types of gnotobiotic model organisms as tools for studying interactions between host organisms and microorganisms is referred to as gnotobiology.

== History ==
The concept and field of gnotobiology was born of a debate between Louis Pasteur and Marceli Nencki in the late 19th century, in which Pasteur argued that animal life needed bacteria to succeed while Nencki argued that animals would be healthier without bacteria, but it wasn't until 1960 that the Association for Gnotobiotics was formed. Early attempts in gnotobiology were limited by inadequate equipment and nutritional knowledge, however, advancements in nutritional sciences, animal anatomy and physiology, and immunology have allowed for the improvement of gnotobiotic technologies.

=== Methods ===
Guinea pigs were the first germ-free animal model described in 1896 by George Nuttall and Hans Thierfelder, establishing techniques still used today in gnotobiology. Early methods for maintaining sterile environments involved sterile glass jars and gloveboxes, which developed into a conversation surrounding uniformity of the methods in the field at the 1939 symposium on Micrurgical and Germ-free Methods at the University of Notre Dame. Many early (1930-1950s) accomplishments in gnotobiology came from Notre Dame University, The University of Lund, and Nagoya University. The Laboratories of Bacteriology at the University of Notre Dame (known as LOBUND) was founded by John J. Cavanaugh and is cited for making some of the most notable achievements in the field of gnotobiotic research. Under the direction of James A. Reyniers, early work at LOBUND focused on obtaining gnotobiotes by sterilizing animals and maintaining the animals using high-pressure steam sterilized steel isolators; however, later work at the institute shifted the focus of the field towards establishing colonies of animals born germ-free. The first germ-free rat colony was generated and maintained using a steam sterilized isolator in 1946 by Swedish scientist Bengt Gustafsson. Flexible film isolators using peracetic acid vapor for sterilization began being developed in the 1950s. Refined sterilization techniques and manufacturing changes from LOBUND significantly reduced the size and cost of isolators, making gnotobiotic research more universally accessible. After numerous advances in gnotobiotic research and technologies, the main challenges facing gnotobiotic research today are cost, space, efficiency, and operational procedure requirements. In 2015, the costs of maintaining gnotobiotic mice cages was greater than 4 times the cost of maintaining those of non-gnotobiotic mice, creating a challenge for establishing and maintaining facilities using typical funding sources, such as federal grants from institutions like the NIH.

=== Applications ===
The early focus of the field of gnotobiology was on proving that an organism could live in the absence of microorganisms, which ultimately resulted in the development of gnotobiotic organisms as a tool for research. Between the 1950s and 1970s, germ-free models were used to study the effects of the absence of bacteria on host organism metabolism and physiology, which later evolved into intentionally infecting germ-free organisms with specific microorganisms to investigate their functions and other questions relating to the biomedical field. In the early 1970s, gnotobiotes were used to study the role of microorganisms in host nutrition acquisition and immune response; however, this was limited because animals reared in a gnotobiotic colony often have poorly developed immune systems, lower cardiac output, and thin intestinal walls, which make them highly susceptible to infectious pathogens. After the early 1970s, gnotobiotic research decreased until the mid-1980s. Within the 21st century, gnotobiotic model systems have become an important tool for investigating interactions between host organisms and their commensal microbiota, as they allow for researchers to investigate specific microbes in a highly controlled host system. Historically, mouse models have been used to investigate the impacts of the microbiota composition (which microorganisms are present) on host immune system, nervous system, metabolism, and physiology; however, an increasing interest in this field has led to the incorporation of other model organisms to address a larger variety of questions relating to these topics.

== Animals ==
A gnotobiotic animal (gnotobiote) is an animal in which all microorganisms interacting with it are known and controlled. Gnotobiotic animals are typically born under aseptic conditions, which may include removal from the mother by Caesarean section followed by immediate transfer of the newborn to an isolator where all incoming air, food and water is sterilized. Gnotobiotes are usually raised in a sterile laboratory environment, and are only intentionally exposed to microorganisms of interest to researchers. Mice and rats are common gnotobiotic animals used in research, but other examples of important gnotobiotes include Caenorhabditis elegans (C. elegans), Drosophila melanogaster (D. melanogaster), zebrafish, and piglets. Gnotobiotes are used as a controlled environment in which to study host anatomy and physiology, the specific symbiotic interactions between a host and specific microorganisms, and the impacts of chemicals on the host and its microbiota.

=== Mammals ===
Rodents (primarily mice and rats) are the most common mammalian model systems used for studying gnotobiosis and are widely used to study human health relating to the gut and interactions between microorganisms and their host; however, recently there has been a rise in using gnotobiotic mice to study interactions between different microorganisms (microbe-microbe interactions) in the gut. Humanized gnotobiotic mice, or gnotobiotic mice introduced to human intestinal microorganisms by fecal microbiota transplant with human feces, are used in the context of studying gut microbiota and their relationship with host cancers, immune system, and nutrition. Some advantages of gnotobiotic mice and rat systems include the uniformity of the organism, historical prevalence, and established system-specific methods, as well as the ability to obtain reliable gnotobiotic mice and rats commercially.

=== Fish ===
Gnotobiotic fish have been used as a model organism for human health; however, an increased interest in aquaculture for sustainable food production has led to increasing prevalence of gnotobiotic studies focused on maximizing production and maintaining healthy captive populations. The majority of research is still only conducted on a few species of fish, such as the zebra fish. Some of the advantages of gnotobiotic fish systems include high numbers of offspring per reproduction event coupled with fast generation times and eggs that can be sanitized.

== Plants ==
Gnotobiotic plants are plants that are either grown without microorganisms present (aseptic, axenic, or sterile) or grown in the presence of one (monoxenic) or more than one (polyxenic) known microorganism. To obtain gnotobiotic plants, researchers sterilize seeds using chemical agents (e.g., ethanol, sodium hypochlorite (bleach), hydrogen peroxide) on the surface of the seed. A wide variety of plants have been used to generate gnotobiotic systems such as Arabidopsis thaliana, peanuts, oats, corn, and many others. Similar to animals, gnotobiotic plant systems have been used to study integral components of host physiology (e.g., nitrogen fixation), as well as pathogenic and symbiotic interactions between plants and microorganisms.

== See also ==
- Specific-pathogen-free (SPF)
- Axenic culture
