= Abderrahmane Kaidi =

Researcher

- Education: University of Bristol
- Known for: Research in DNA damage and their relevance to cancer Scientific misconduct
- Scientific career
- Fields: Cell biology Molecular biology
- Workplaces: University of Bristol
- Thesis: The role of hypoxia in colorectal tumorigenesis (2007)
- Doctoral advisor: Christos Paraskeva

Abderrahmane Kaidi is a biologist whose research focused on cancer and DNA damage. He is best known for committing research fraud that led to his resignation as a lecturer at the University of Bristol. In 2018, he was investigated by the university for alleged misconducts in behaviour and research issues. He was found guilty of faking research, which he admitted as a mean to impress other scientists for collaboration and were not for publication.

The University of Cambridge also investigated Kaidi's research while he worked as a postdoctoral scholar at the Gurdon Institute from where he published several papers on DNA damage. Two articles, published one each in the journal Science (in 2010) and Nature (in 2013), were retracted simultaneously on 11 April 2019 following evidence of data fabrications.

== Education and career ==
Kaidi enrolled for Ph.D. in Cellular and Molecular Medicine at the University of Bristol in 2003. Supervised by Christos Paraskeva, he made important contributions to the understanding of how bowel (colorectal) cancer cells grow and die. He received his doctorate in 2007 on the thesis The role of hypoxia in colorectal tumorigenesis. Under postdoctoral programme, he moved to Stephen Jackson's laboratory at the Gurdon Institute of the University of Cambridge, where he focussed his research on DNA damage and remained there for five years. In 2010, he was elected to research fellowship at the Wolfson College of Cambridge. He was also appointed Hershel Smith Research Fellow between 2009 and 2012.

In 2013, Kaidi was appointed Senior Lecturer in Cellular and Molecular Medicine at the University of Bristol. He was awarded the Seed Awards in Science in 2015 by the Wellcome Trust for an investigation on "Molecular mechanisms linking nuclear lamina and chromatin organisation". The same year, he also received the MRC New Investigator Award. In 2016, he was awarded jointly with Robert Grosse of the University of Marburg and Kei Miyamoto of the Kindai University a three-year research grant from the Human Frontier Science Program. In January 2018, he was appointed among "ambassadors of good practice in science" of eLife.

On 13 September 2018, Kaidi resigned from the university after admitting research fraud.

== Misconduct ==
In 2018, the University of Bristol received and investigated allegations against Kaidi on two cases, his research work concerned with data fabrication and "behaviour in the laboratory towards other members of his research group." He had prepared fake experiments with made-up data that he gave to a colleague. The university announced that: "Dr Kaidi admitted to having fabricated research data to convince a research collaborator in another institution that certain experiments had taken place, when this was not the case. Dr Kaidi has taken full responsibility for his actions and no other member of his research group is implicated." Kaidi claimed that the fabricated experiment was not meant for publication. Following admission of guilt, he resigned from the university.

=== Retraction of research papers ===
While working as a postdoctoral scholar at the Gurdon Institute during 2007 to 2013, Kaidi and his mentor Jackson published three research papers in high-ranking journals, Nature, Science, and The EMBO Journal. The Science paper written with Brian T. Weinert, Chunaram Choudhary and Jackson that was published in 2010 describes how sirtuin enzyme, SIRT6, mediates DNA repair. The EMBO paper also in 2010 was written with Sophie E. Polo, Linda Baskcomb, Yaron Galanty and Jackson. It reports the first demonstration of the functions of DNA-binding protein 4 (CHD4) on DNA damage and cell cycle regulation. The Nature paper in 2013, written with Jackson, is about the protein, lysine acetyltransferase, KAT5 that is involved in DNA damage process.

During the Bristol investigation, Kaidi confessed that he had made false data in two of his research papers published from Cambridge. Bristol conveyed the matter to the University of Cambridge which took up an investigation. On 19 August 2018, Cambridge and Jackson informed Science that the 2010 paper was investigated for research misconduct. The journal issued an expression on concern over the article the next month. Cambridge made its final decision in April 2019 that Kaidi's Science and Nature papers contain falsified data, stating:

The investigation has upheld the allegations against Dr Kaidi, who has admitted misrepresentation and fabrication of data in two papers. Dr Kaidi has taken full and sole responsibility for these actions. The University's investigation did not identify any concerns regarding any of Dr Kaidi's co-authors on these papers. The journals concerned have been informed of the outcome of the University investigation.

On 11 April 2019, the articles in Science and Nature were simultaneously retracted by the journals. Science announced that: "[based on Cambridge investigation] there was falsification of research data... that the first author, Abderrahmane Kaidi, was responsible for the falsification of the data." Nature commented: "The authors cannot confirm the results in the affected figures and thus wish to retract the Article in its entirety. Both authors, Abderrahmane Kaidi and Stephen P. Jackson, agree with the Retraction."

The EMBO Journal also investigated its Kaidi's article, but found no "concrete indication" of data manipulation that the editor-in-chief, Bernd Pulverer, declared that further action was not needed.
