= Pseudotrichomonas keilini =

Scientific classification
- Domain: Eukaryota
- (unranked): Excavata
- Phylum: Metamonada
- Class: Parabasalia
- Order: Trichomonadida
- Family: Monocercomonadidae
- Genus: Pseudotrichomonas
- Species: P. keilini

Binomial name
- Pseudotrichomonas keilini Bishop, 1939

Species of protist

Pseudotrichomonas keilini is a species of excavate that was discovered by Ann Bishop in 1939.
