= Parasitology (journal) =

- Discipline: Parasitology
- Language: English
- Edited by: John Russell Stothard

Publication details
- History: 1908–present
- Publisher: Cambridge University Press
- Frequency: 14/year
- Open access: Yes
- License: Creative Commons licence
- Impact factor: 2.4 (2022)

Standard abbreviations
- ISO 4: Parasitology

Indexing
- CODEN: PARAAE
- ISSN: 0031-1820 (print); 1469-8161 (web)
- LCCN: 09023419
- OCLC no.: 1714177

Links
- Journal homepage; Online access; Online archive

Parasitology is a peer-reviewed scientific journal covering the area of parasitology, including the biochemistry, molecular biology, genetics, ecology and epidemiology of eukaryotic parasites, and the relationship between the host and the parasite. It was established in 1908 and is published fourteen times a year by Cambridge University Press. The editor-in-chief is John Russell Stothard (Liverpool School of Tropical Medicine).

Cambridge University Press announced that as of 3 October 2022, publishing would be switching to gold open access.

== History ==
The journal was established in 1908 by George Nuttall, who served as the editor until his death in 1933. Subsequent editors have included David Keilin (1934–63), Parr Tate (1952–68), Harry Crofton (1968–72), David Crompton and Bruce Newton (1973–81), Frank Cox (1982–2000), Phil Whitfield (1982–86), Chris Arme (1987–2006), Stephen Phillips (2000–20), Robin Gasser (2005 – after 2009) and Les Chappell (2006 – after 2009). John Russell Stothard took over from Phillips as editor-in-chief in 2020.

== Abstracting and indexing ==
The journal is abstracted and indexed by:

- Abstracts on Hygiene and Communicable Diseases
- BIOSIS Previews
- Chemical Abstracts Service
- Current Advances in Ecological Sciences
- Current Contents/Life Sciences
- Dairy Science Abstracts
- Elsevier BIOBASE/Current Awareness in Biological Sciences
- Embase/Excerpta Medica
- Helminthology Abstracts
- Index Medicus/MEDLINE/PubMed
- Protozoological Abstracts
- Review of Applied Entomology
- Science Citation Index
- Veterinary Bulletin
- Tropical Diseases Bulletin

According to the Journal Citation Reports, the journal has a 2022 impact factor of 2.4.
