= Thaddeus Mann =

Polish chemist (1908–1993)

Thaddeus Mann CBE FRS
- Born: Thaddeus Robert Rudolph Mann; 4 December 1908; Lwow, Austria-Hungary (now Lviv, Ukraine)
- Died: 27 November 1993 (aged 85); Cambridge, England
- Education: Johannes Casimirus University, Lwow (Doctor of Medicine, 1934); Molteno Institute, Cambridge
- Spouse: Cecilia Lutwak-Mann
- Scientific career
- Institutions: Molteno Institute

Thaddeus Robert Rudolph Mann CBE FRS (4 December 1908 – 27 November 1993) was a biochemist who made significant contributions to the field of reproductive biology. He was born in Lwow, Austria-Hungary (now Ukraine) and was educated at Lwow University. He studied medicine at the Johannes Casimirus University in Lwow, obtaining the degrees of Physician in 1932 and Doctor of Medicine in 1934.

He continued his education at the Molteno Institute, Cambridge on a Rockefeller Fellowship, 1935–1937, and remained at the University of Cambridge during the rest of his career. He died in Cambridge.

Mann began his career in the laboratory of Professor Jacob Karol Parnas (1884–1949) in Poland, where he was involved in research on glycolysis and muscle energy metabolism.

He was elected a Fellow of the Royal Society in 1951.

He was married to Cecilia Lutwak-Mann, an endocrinologist and physiologist.

== Publications ==
Thaddeus Mann published more than 250 papers, and several books.

- Mann, T (1954), The Biochemistry of Semen, London: Methuen & Co; New York: John Wiley & Sons
