= Molteno Institute for Research in Parasitology =

Defunct research institute in the United Kingdom

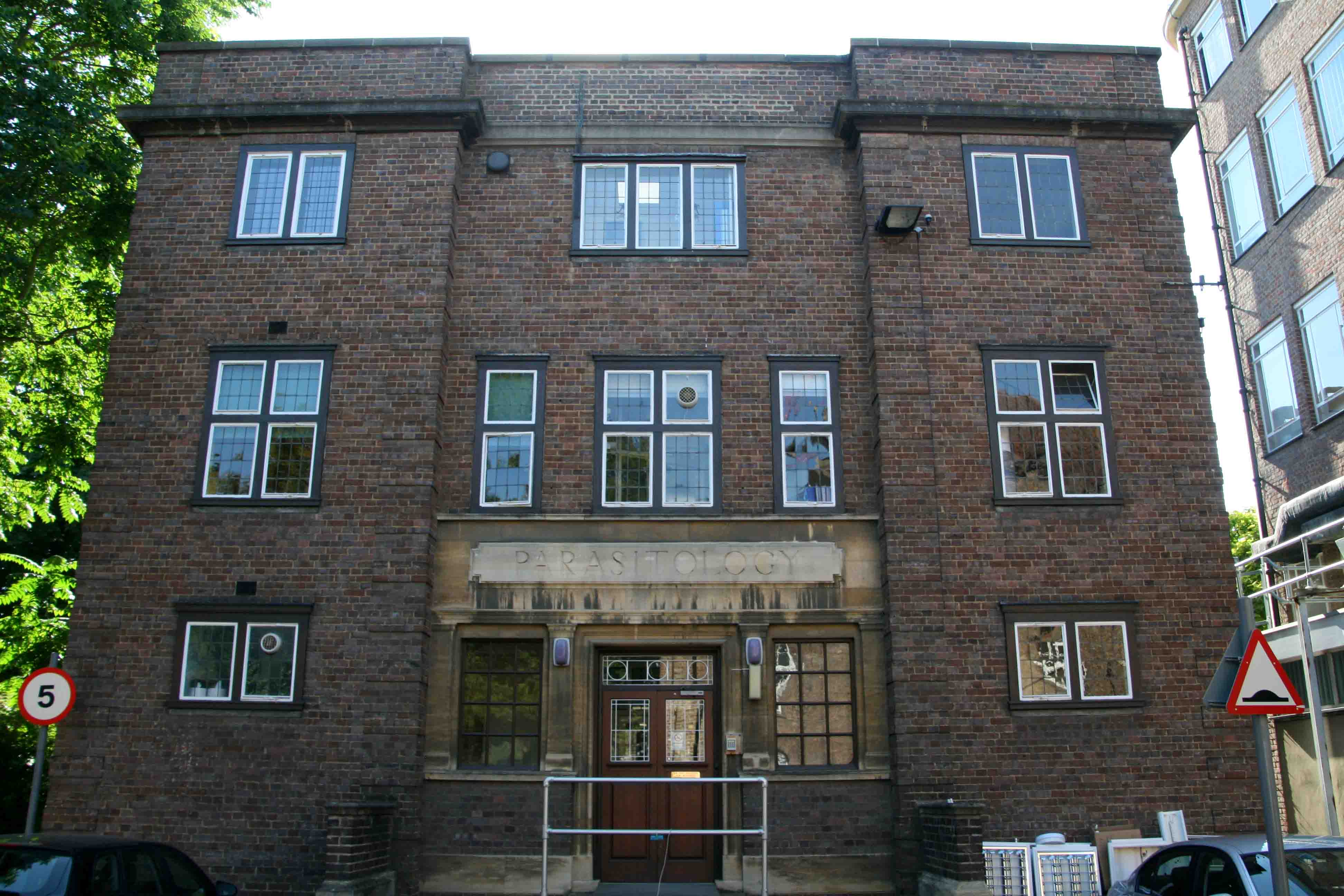
The Molteno Institute for Research in Parasitology, Cambridge

The Molteno Institute for Research in Parasitology was a biological research institute in the University of Cambridge, UK, situated on the Downing Site and founded in response to an appeal by the Quick Professor by a $150 000 gift from Mr & Mrs Percy Alport Molteno in 1919. When it opened in 1921 it was the first parasite biology institute to be established. Between 1947 and 1964 the MRC (Medical Research Council) Chemotherapy Research Unit was based in 'the Molteno', but research into parasitology continued alongside. Later, between 1968 and 1987, 'the Molteno' became fully occupied by the MRC as their Biochemical Parasitology Unit and totally dedicated to research into parasitology, although the building was still rented from the University of Cambridge. In September 1987 it became part of the University of Cambridge's Pathology Department. Notable workers include Ann Bishop, Douglas Mackay Henderson, David Keilin, Thaddeus Mann and Brunó Ferenc Straub.

George Nuttall was the founding director of the institute; he was succeeded by David Keilin, followed by Parr Tate.
