= John Russell Stothard =

British medical parasitologist

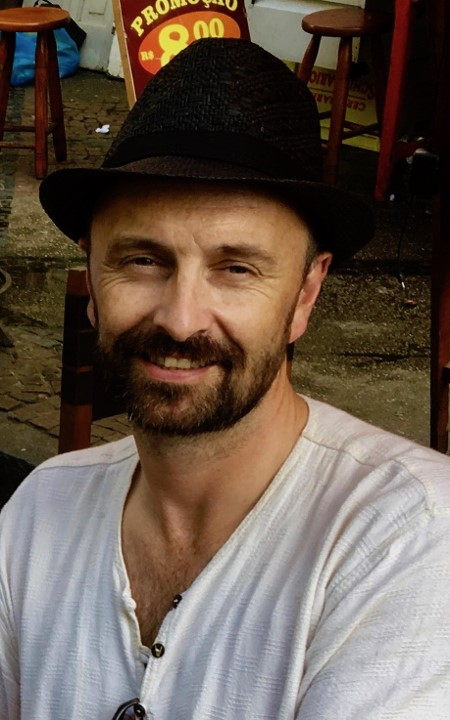
- Born: 21 March 1970 (age 56)
- Education: University of Leeds (BSc); University of York (MSc); Imperial College London (PhD)
- Occupation: Professor of Parasitology
- Known for: Epidemiology and control of schistosomiasis and neglected tropical diseases (NTDs).
- Awards: Bicentenary Medal of the Linnean Society of London in 2004; C.A. Wright Memorial Medal of the British Society for Parasitology in 2019.
- Website: www.lstmed.ac.uk/about/people/professor-russell-stothard

John Russell Stothard FRGS FLS (born 21 March 1970) is a British scientist, professor of parasitology at Liverpool School of Tropical Medicine, and well known for his teaching and research into schistosomiasis and neglected tropical diseases. He was the recipient of the Bicentenary Medal of the Linnean Society of London in 2004, and the C.A. Wright Memorial Medal of the British Society for Parasitology in 2019. He has previously held positions at London's Natural History Museum, London School of Hygiene and Tropical Medicine, and at Imperial College London between 1992 and 2010.

== Early life and education ==
Stothard grew up on a livestock farm in coastal Northumberland in the north of England. Upon leaving college, he joined University of Leeds to study for a BSc in Zoology and Microbiology between 1988 and 1991, before graduating and moving to join University of York in 1991 to complete a MSc in Biological Computation. Between 1992 and 1995, he undertook PhD studies focused on the epidemiology of schistosomiasis in sub-Saharan Africa, jointly hosted at Imperial College London and Natural History Museum, London under the supervision of David Rollinson.

== Research and teaching career ==
Stothard's research and teaching is focused upon medical parasitology, with particular emphasis on neglected tropical diseases, most notably the epidemiology and control of schistosomiasis. His work seeks to advance understanding of key parasites and intermediate hosts/vectors thereof, to better tailor future interventions in control and elimination of parasitic disease in not only humans, but to other animals including livestock, companion animals and wildlife.

He has over 237 publications on Scopus (>6300 citations, h-index 41, average citation per item 26.4; ORCID: 0000-0002-9370-3420), with the top five-most cited publications accumulating 567 citations to date.

Stothard's research relevance has prompted invites to present, chair and contribute to several World Health Organisation (WHO) expert committees including 'Guideline Review at Head Office/African Regional Office (Schistosomiasis)'; 'Roadmap for control of schistosomiasis: Schistosomiasis: progress report 2001–2011, strategic plan 2012–2020'; and 'Eliminating soil-transmitted helminthiases as a public health problem in children Progress report 2001−2010 and strategic plan 2011–2020'.

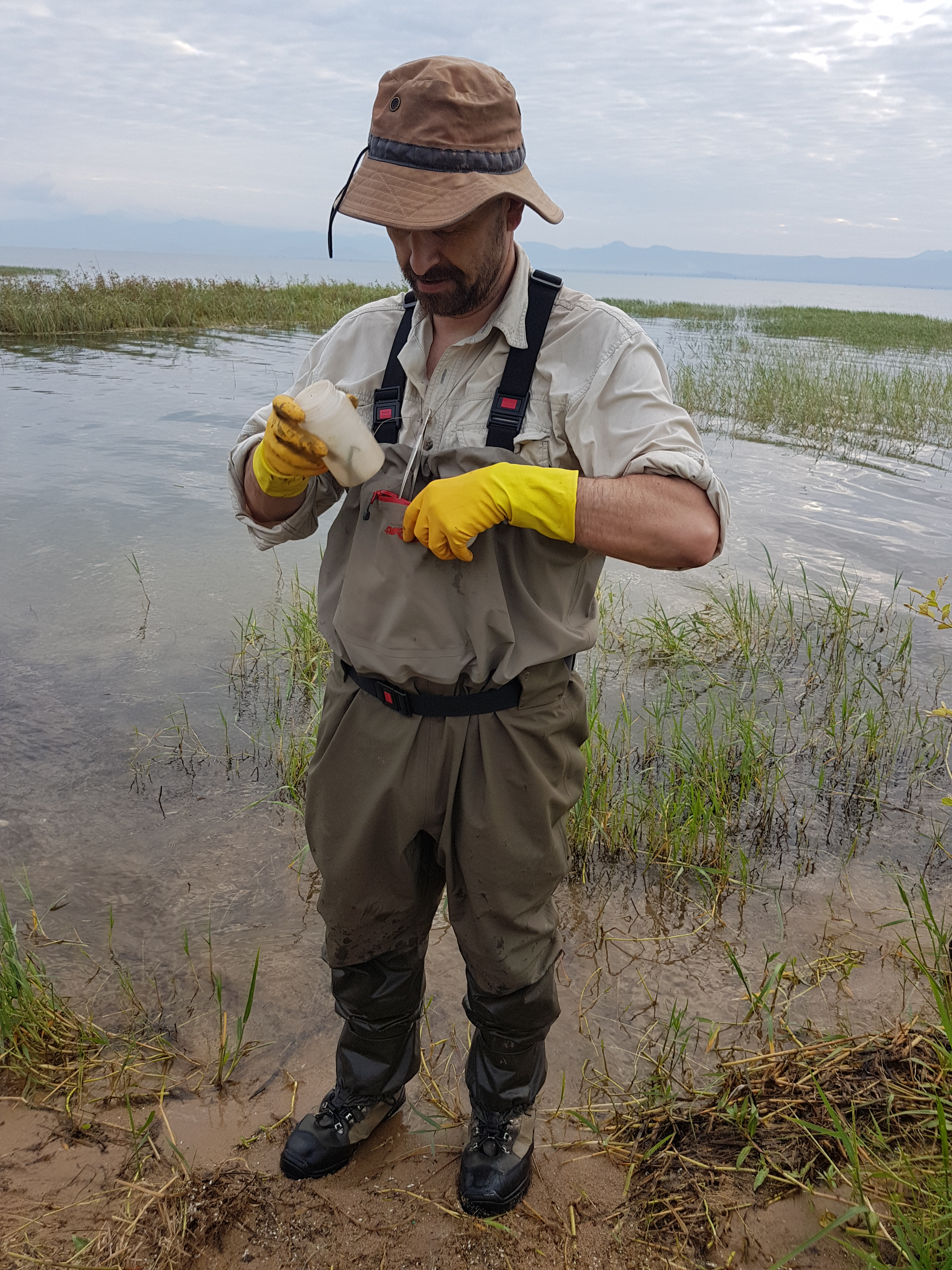
Stothard in Malawi in 2018, collecting snail intermediate hosts of Schistosoma species parasites

Stothard has been director of COUNTDOWN, a large DFID-UK funded interdisciplinary implementation research consortium (2014–2019), and lead a Wellcome Trust funded longitudinal cohort study of 'Schistosomiasis in Mothers and Infants' (SIMI) project (2008–2013), which featured on BBC2. His work as a founding member of the Schistosomiasis Control Initiative (2002–2004), and involvement in study of the hybrid biology of schistosomiasis first beginning in Senegal a decade ago with EU_CONTRAST (2006–2010), are of relevance in use of point-of-care diagnostics, molecular approaches and inclusion of one-health understanding of schistosomiasis control.

== Awards and memberships ==
Stothard's multidisciplinary studies on Zanzibar, provided groundwork for subsequent international efforts towards elimination strategies in urogenital schistosomiasis. This work gained him the Bicentenary Medal of the Linnean Society of London in 2004.

In April 2019, Stothard was again honoured with the 2019 C.A. Wright Memorial Medal of the British Society for Parasitology for outstanding contribution to parasitology over more than twenty years. Stothard is the co-editor of two peer-reviewed scientific journals, Advances in Parasitology and Parasitology and a regular reviewer for a range of other peer-reviewed scientific journals.

Between 2004 and 2010 he was elected as honorary scientific secretary and executive board member at the Royal Society for Tropical Medicine and Hygiene. Following completion of this appointment, he was elected to Honorary General Secretary of the British Society for Parasitology between 2011 and 2016. He remains an ordinary member of both societies.
