= George Stuart Graham-Smith =

British zoologist and pathologist

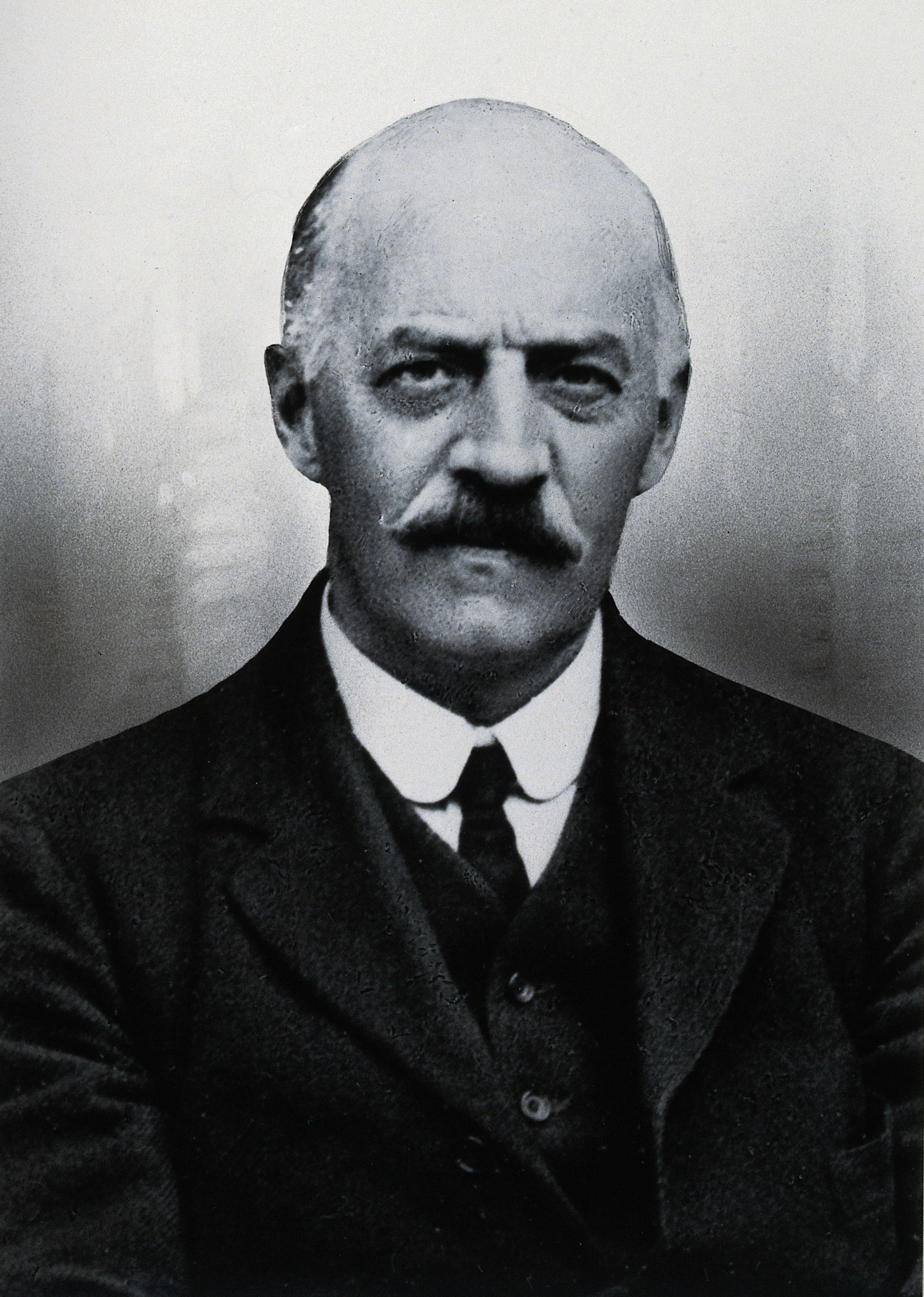
- Born: 25 September 1875
- Died: 30 August 1950 (aged 74); Cambridge
- Education: Clifton College; Pembroke College, Cambridge
- Known for: Research on flies
- Spouse: Violet Leith-Ross
- Awards: Fellow of the Royal Society
- Scientific career
- Fields: Pathology, Zoology

George Stuart Graham-Smith (25 September 1875 – 30 August 1950) was a British pathologist and zoologist particularly noted for his work on flies, both as disease vectors, and as organisms of interest in their own right.

== Early life and education ==
Graham-Smith was the son of a colonel in the Indian Army. He attended Clifton College and then studied at Pembroke College, Cambridge, where he played a lot of cricket and graduated with a B.A. in 1897. He then studied medicine at Guy's Hospital, London, obtaining his M.B. B.Chir. in 1901. He returned to Cambridge, to the Department of Pathology, and took the Diploma in Public Health in 1902. In 1904 he became the John Lucas Walter student, a scholarship awarded for original research in pathology, and obtained his M.D. in 1905.

== Diphtheria ==
Chart showing the infections and deaths from diphtheria in Colchester in 1901. The lower section shows the decline in mortality from 25.9 to 5.8% after the introduction of treatment with antitoxin.

In 1901, Graham-Smith was enrolled in a pathology class taught by Louis Cobbett in Cambridge. In the spring of that year there was a local outbreak of diphtheria, and the class followed the progress of Cobbett's work on identifying organisms from swabs, inoculating animals, and dealing with patients, doctors and sanitary inspectors. In the summer of the same year, there was an outbreak of diphthera in Colchester, and Graham-Smith went there as Cobbett's assistant. His work there was the basis for his first publication, which formed part of his M.D. Thesis. He describes the measures taken to deal with the outbreak, which included treatment with antitoxin, bacteriological testing of patients and contacts, isolation of patients until they were shown to be free of infection, and closure of schools followed by exclusion of infected pupils once they re-opened. The outbreak declined in the autumn of 1901.

Graham-Smith continued to work on diphtheria for the next few years. In 1903 and 1904 he published two papers presenting evidence, both from a review of the literature and his own and Cobbett's work, on the incidence of infection in patients, contacts without symptoms, and those with no exposure, and on the implications of these findings for disease control measures. He emphasised the importance of testing the virulence of the bacilli found, as well as identification based on morphology and culture properties. He concluded that virulent strains were rarely found in healthy people without known contact with patients diagnosed with diphtheria, a finding that supported a policy based on isolating and testing diphtheria contacts.

== Collaboration with George Nuttall ==
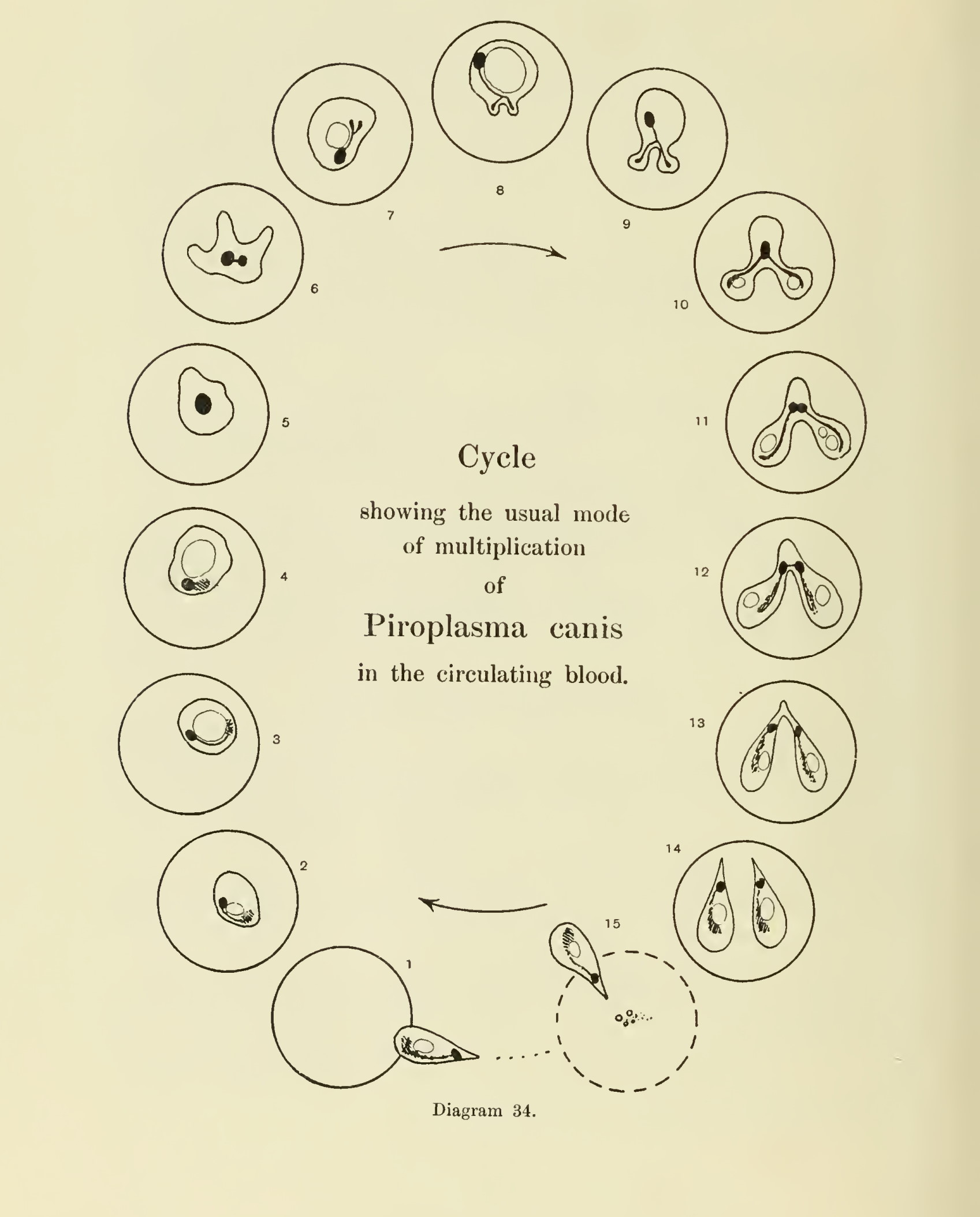
Multiplication of Piroplasma canis within red blood cells. Only a single division is shown: red blood cells often contained up to 16 organisms, sometimes more, before the cell ruptured releasing the parasites.

During this period, Graham-Smith developed a close working relationship with George Nuttall, who had been appointed University Lecturer in Bacteriology and Preventive Medicine in 1900. They co-edited The Bacteriology of Diphtheria, which appeared in 1908, the first major work on this topic to be published in Britain. Nuttall and Graham-Smith also worked together on a series of studies of canine Piroplasma canis, now known as Babesia canis, a protozoan parasite that invades the red blood cells of dogs, and is transmitted by ticks. Schetters (2019), reviewing the literature on this parasite in dogs, re-tabulated Graham-Smith's data on morbid anatomy, and confirmed his key finding of an accumulation of infected red blood cells in the capillaries. Another infection of the blood was first described by Graham-Smith in moles. The organism, a Gram-negative bacterium, was named Grahamella in his honour, but is now classified as Bartonella.

Graham-Smith's work in straightforward zoology (i.e. not involving pathology) began with a collaboration with Nuttall on a project to assess the degree of relatededness between animal groups (blood relationships) on the basis of immunological cross-reactions between serum proteins. This work, published as Blood Immunity and Blood-Relationships in 1904 represents the beginning of the modern field of molecular systematics. Graham-Smith contributed section VIII: Blood-relationship among the lower vertebrata and arthropoda, etc., as indicated by 2500 tests with precipitating antisera.

In 1906, Nuttall became Reader in Hygiene at Cambridge University. In the following year, Graham-Smith was appointed Lecturer in Hygiene, a position he held until 1923, when he succeeded Nuttall as Reader.

== Flies ==
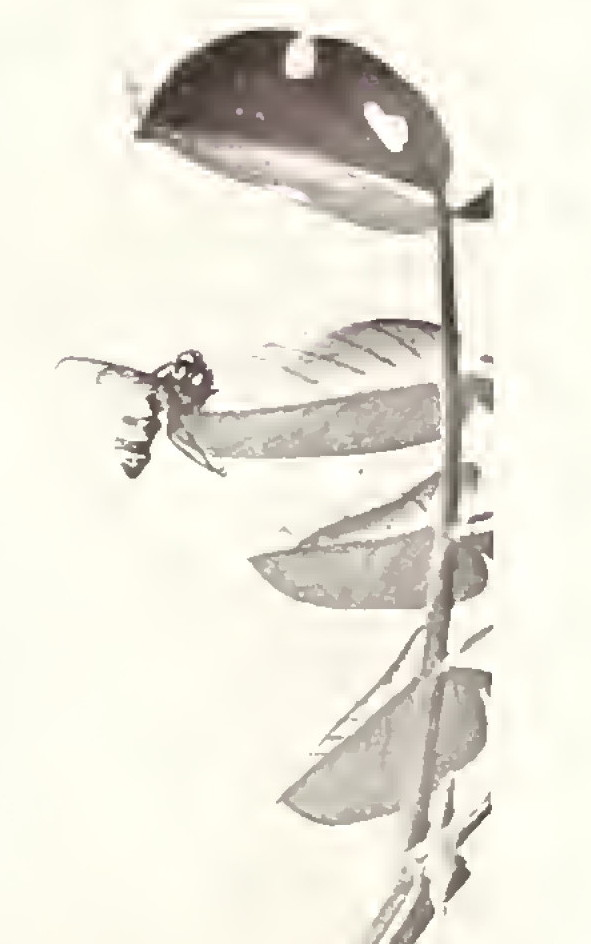
A female Hydrotaea dentipes dead of Empusa disease, attached to a leaf.

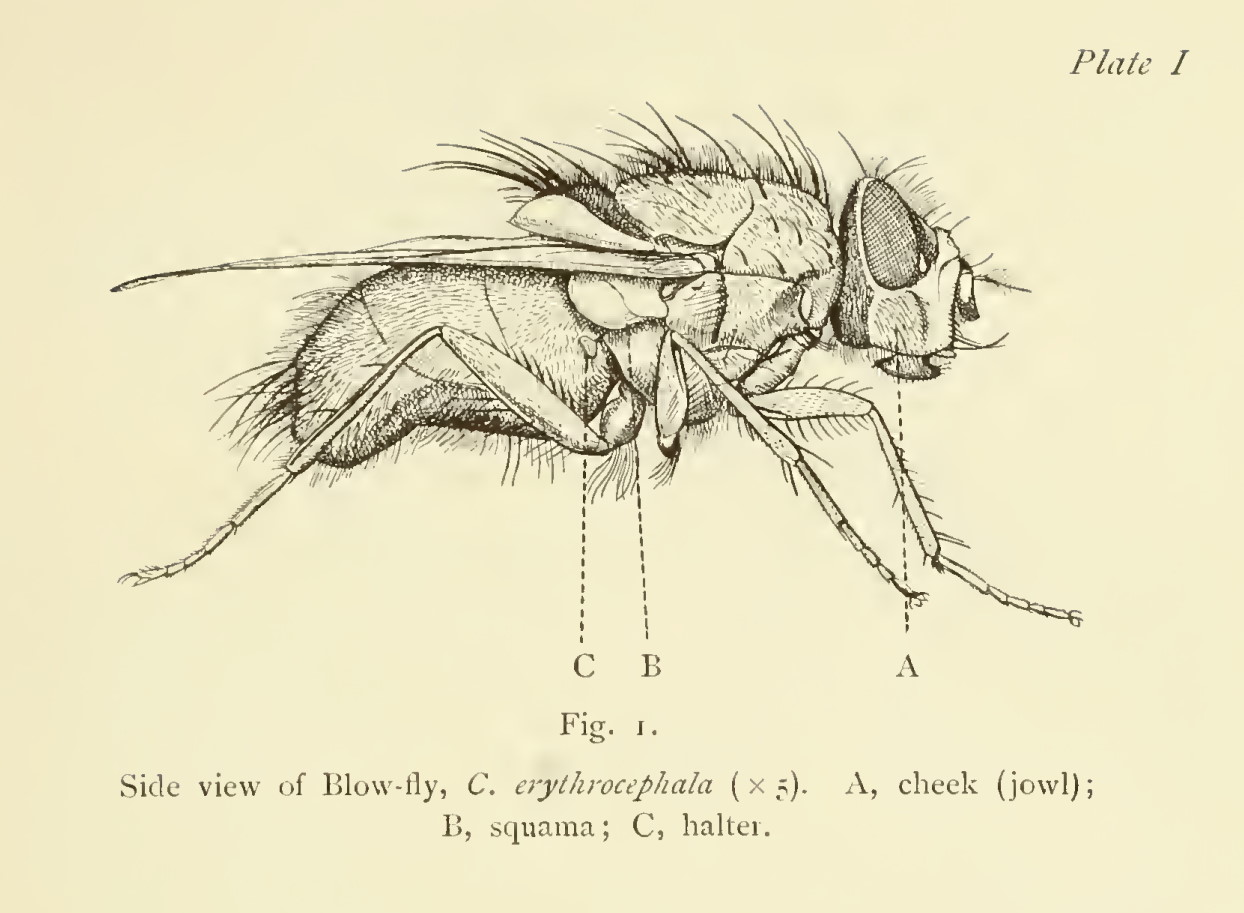
Side-view of blow-fly

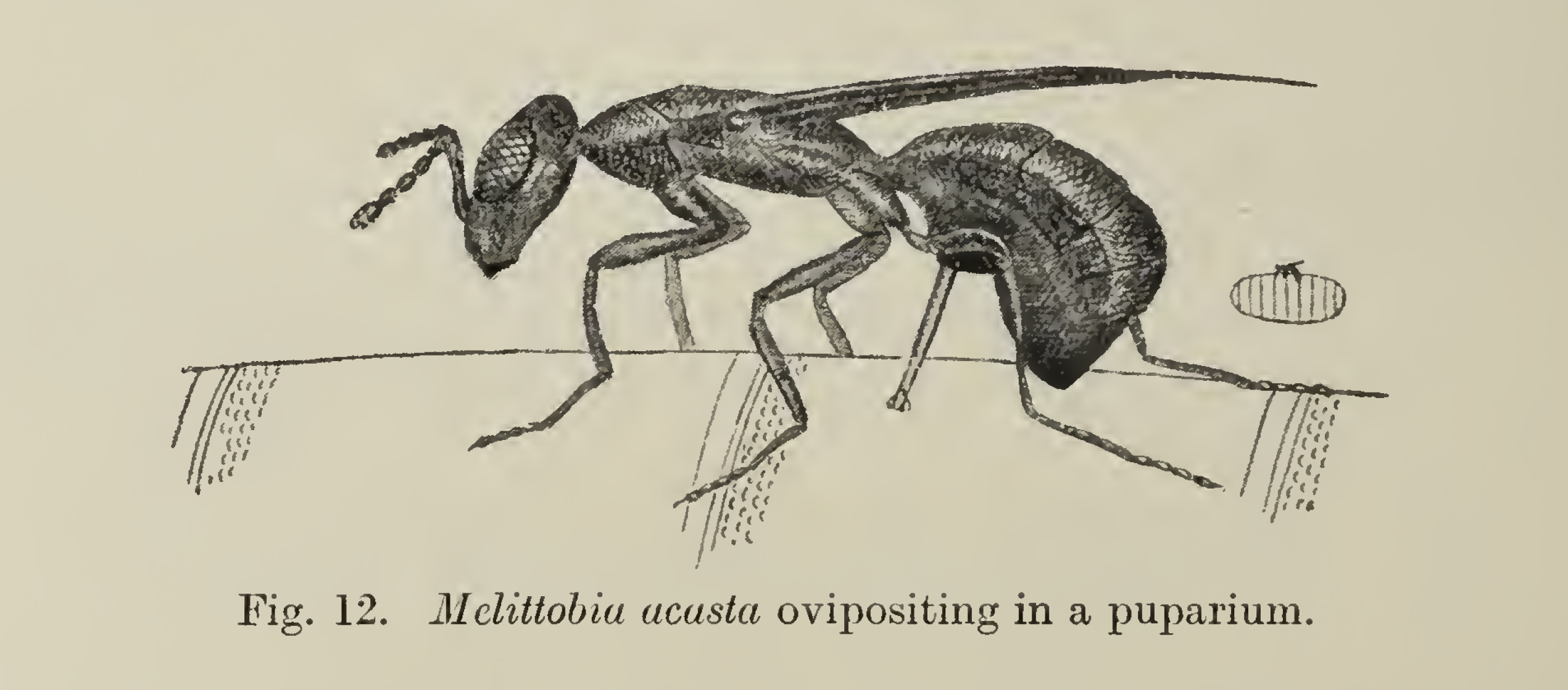
Melittobia acasta ovipositing on a fly pupa.

Graham-Smith's research on flies, which became a life-long interest, combined both pathological and zoological aspects: flies as vectors of disease, and as organisms of interest in their own right. His first published works on this topic, local government health reports, dealt with pathology, showing that flies in the wild could pick up infections from their environment, and that artificially infected flies could transmit infections to the materials that they fed from. In subsequent publications he dealt with the morphology, anatomy, physiology and behaviour of flies, as well as their role in human disease, and also diseases and parasites that affect flies.

He made extensive observations of Empusa disease, a fungal parasite. The fungus spreads through the body of an infected fly, which becomes attached to a leaf, usually by the head. The fungus digests the body of the fly, then disperses its spores. Another important group of parasites, generally other insects, deposit their eggs within the larvae or pupae of flies. Graham-Smith showed that these are common, adults of the parasitic species frequently emerging from fly pupae collected in the wild. He also carried out laboratory studies, for example describing the egg-laying behaviour of the wasp Melittobia acasta.

In the late 19th- and early 20th-Centuries, summer diarrhoea was an important cause of death, particularly in children. The incidence of the condition was closely related to air temperature, and opinions differed as to mechanism. Some thought that temperature was directly responsible, while others considered that temperature acted though another factor, for example increasing the number of flies that could transmit disease. Graham-Smith devoted a chapter of his 1913 book Flies in relation to disease : non-bloodsucking flies to summer diarrhoea. He reviewed the epidemiogical and bacterological evidence, including results from his own studies on bacteria harboured by flies caught in the wild. He concluded that the evidence was strongly suggestive of a connection between flies and summer diarrhoea. However he noted that there was no clear evidence of the sources of infection that the flies transmitted. In later epidemiological work he provided such evidence. In the years after World War I deaths from summer diarrhoea steadily declined. Presenting data over the period from 1901 to 1937, and allowing for differences in temperature in different years, he showed that the death rate closely matched the numbers of horse-drawn vehicles. At the beginning of the period, the death rate for children under one year of age in England and Wales was 25.4 per thousand live births, at the end it was 5.3. The number of licenses for hose-drawn vehicles fell from 411,334 to 14,195. This strongly suggested that horse manure was a principal source of the infection transmitted by flies.

== Teaching and administration ==
Graham-Smith was active in teaching throughout his career, teaching bacteriology in both the Diploma of Public Health and from 1924 in the Natural Sciences Tripos. His administrative duties included Assessor to the Regius Professor of Medicine (1907-1919) and Secretary to the Faculty Board of Medicine (1919-1933). From 1939 he was editor of the Journal of Hygiene.

== Honours ==
In 1919 Graham-Smith was elected a Fellow of the Royal Society.

== Personal life and death ==
In September 1910, Graham-Smith married Violet Leith-Ross of Aberdeenshire. He died suddenly on 30 August 1950, in Cambridge. He was survived by his wife and a son.
