= Cecilia Lutwak-Mann =

German-British endocrinologist and physiologist

- Cecilia Lutwak-Mann in about 1955.
- Born: About 1900
- Died: 1987
- Education: University of Lviv (M.D.)
- Known for: Discovery of the role of progesterone in the placenta
- Spouse: Thaddeus Mann
- Scientific career
- Fields: Endocrinology, physiology
- Workplaces: Agricultural Research Council of Great Britain

Cecilia Lutwak-Mann (1900(?)-1987) was a Polish-British endocrinologist and physiologist.

== Career ==
She was educated at the University of Lviv (now in Ukraine), where she obtained a doctorate of medicine. She studied the menstrual cycle, cellular respiration, and embryology, and served as chief scientific officer of the Agricultural Research Council of Great Britain.

Lutwak-Mann was known for discovering that the hormone progesterone acts on the placenta to control carbonic anhydrase synthesis. She also co-authored the then-reference text on male reproductive function and semen ("Male Reproductive Function and Semen: Themes and Trends in Physiology, Biochemistry and Investigative Andrology", 1981) with Thaddeus Mann.

== Personal life ==
Lutwak-Mann married Thaddeus Mann in 1934, after they met in medical school. She was Jewish, and moved to Britain in 1935 to continue her research at Cambridge. She died in 1987.
