= Quick Professor of Biology =

University of Cambridge academic post

The Quick Professorship of Biology is one of the senior professorships in biology at the University of Cambridge.

Frederick James Quick (1836–1902), a prosperous coffee merchant and senior partner in the London coffee-firm Quick, Reek and James at the time of his death, bequeathed the majority of his wealth to the University of Cambridge (where he had been a student at Trinity Hall, graduating in 1859) to be used in the 'study of vegetable and animal biology'. After much debate, it was decided that a new professorship should be established which would primarily cover the field of protozoology, and in 1906 George Nuttall became the first holder of the chair.

From 1907 to 1921 there was a laboratory associated with the chair, known as the Quick Laboratory: it was a single room, divided into cubicles, on the ground floor of the Cambridge Medical School building. In 1919, after an appeal for funds by the Quick Professor, the Molteno Institute of Parasitology was established. In 1920 the scope of the chair was broadened to the study of parasitology. In 1931 the chair was offered to David Keilin for study of cell biology.

== Quick Professors ==
- George Nuttall (1906)
- David Keilin (1932)
- Vincent Brian Wigglesworth (1952)
- Robin Coombs (1966)
- Christopher Craig Wylie (1988)
- Stephen Philip Jackson (1995)
