= Robert Hebert Quick =

English educator and writer on education

Robert Hebert Quick (30 September 1831 – 1891) was an English educator and writer on education. Political history was the usual venue for Whig history of the sort that presented the past as a story of achievements accumulating to the present stage. However, Quick and G. A. N. Lowndes were the leaders of the Whig school of the history of education. In 1898 Quick explained the value of studying the history of educational reform, arguing that the past accomplishments were cumulative and "would raise us to a higher standing-point from which we may see much that will make the right road clearer to us".

== Life ==
Born in Harrow, London, he was the eldest son of James Carthew Quick, a prosperous merchant. Quick was educated at Harrow School and Trinity College, Cambridge, where he graduated B.A. in 1854 and was ordained the following year. Afterwards he was assistant to Joseph Merriman at Cranleigh School; and assistant master at Harrow School, appointed by Henry Montagu Butler, an old friend.

Quick was the first to lecture at Cambridge on the history of education (1879), to the new teachers' training syndicate.

== Works ==
- Essays on Educational Reformers (1868; second enlarged edition, 1890)

Quick also wrote on Friedrich Fröbel, edited John Locke's Some Thoughts Concerning Education (1880), and reprinted with notes Richard Mulcaster's Positions (1888).

== Legacy ==
Quick's personal library forms what is now the greater part of the Quick Memorial Library collection at the University of London Research library. Books, pamphlets and periodicals are included, dealing with most aspects of education.

== Family ==
Quick married Bertha, a daughter of General Thomas Chase Parr. They had a son, Oliver Chase Quick, and a daughter, Dora.

Quick had a younger brother, Frederick James Quick (1836—1902), also educated at Harrow and Cambridge, who never married. He went into the family firm and left most of his fortune to the University of Cambridge.
