= Hans Thierfelder =

Hans Thierfelder (22 February 1858 – 11 November 1930) was a German biochemist and professor at the University of Tübingen. He studied lipids and phospholipids and was involved in isolating cerebrone, the first glycolipid in 1900.

Thierfelder was born in Rostock where his father Theodor, was a professor of medicine. He graduated from the Rostock Gymnasium and studied medicine from 1876 at Rostock, moving to Tübingen, Heidelberg, Munich and finally graduated in 1881 at Freiburg. Influenced in physiology by Carl von Voit and Wilhelm Kühne he began to work under Otto Nasse at the Institute for Pharmacology and Physiological Chemistry, Rostock. He received an MD in 1883. Preferring research to medical practice he went to work as an assistant to Felix Hoppe-Seyler at Strassburg, and habilitated in 1887. Here he worked with Joseph von Mering on tertiary alcohols and the production of glucuronic acid in urine. Thierfelder published most of his research in the journal begun by Hoppe-Seyler, the Zeitschrift für physiologische Chemie. He helped Hoppe-Seyler produced the sixth edition of the Handbuch der physiologisch und pathologisch-chemischen Analyse (1893) and edited later editions until 1924. He worked with Max Rubner at the University of Berlin in 1891 examining the enzymatic break down of milk. He worked with George H. F. Nuttall to examine Pasteur's idea that micro-organisms were needed for life. They tried to produce sterile guinea pigs and considered that Pasteur was in error. He also worked with Emil Fischer on yeast strains and the breakdown of synthetic sugars. From 1895 he headed the department of physiology at the University of Berlin an became a professor in 1897 and stayed there until 1901. In 1900 he worked with Wörner on brain chemicals and identified cerebron or phrensosin which is now known as a cerebroside. He continued to work on this refusing to take up offers in Marburg and Göttingen. In 1909 he moved to the University of Tübingen to replace Carl Gustav von Hüfner and worked there until his death.
