= Thomas Chase Parr =

Thomas Chase Parr (1802–1883) was a British officer of the East India Company's Bombay Army. He ended his military career with the rank of full general.

== Life ==
He was the son of John Owen Parr I, eldest son of John Parr of Liverpool, by his wife Elizabeth Mary Patrick, daughter of Thomas Patrick. John Owen Parr I was a merchant in the African trade and an insurance broker of Lloyd's of London in partnership with his brother-in-law, Thomas Chase Patrick, who however were declared bankrupt in August 1808.

Parr was an East India Company cadet for the 1818 season. In the 113th Infantry, he took part in the Bani Bu Ali expedition of 1821, and was present at the night attack on Sur. As a young Ensign, he survived a notorious attack by a man-eating tiger in 1825, an event described by his companion James Outram, who shot the tiger.

Parr commanded the Marine Battalion 1833–1835, and the 7th Bombay Native Infantry, in particular in the 1845 operations in the Southern Mahratta country against the rebellion there.

Then Parr took furlough, an extended period in which he married and started a family. His arrival in the United Kingdom in November 1845 was reported, his rank then being a major in the 7th Native Infantry. The East-India Register and Army List for 1847 has him as a lieutenant-colonel with the 1st European Regiment, on furlough. On 22 February 1849 he was presented to Queen Victoria at a levée, by Thomas Pemberton Leigh. In March 1849 he was given leave to remain in the United Kingdom.

Parr's wife gave birth to a daughter in Bhuj, in 1851. In the 1856 East-India Register and Army List, Parr was listed as colonel, commandant at Kurrachee (Karachi), and on furlough. He was Colonel of the 2nd European Regiment during the Indian Mutiny.

On leaving India, Parr took with him the colours of the 7th Bombay Native Infantry. By the late 1860s, he was living in Harrow-on-the-Hill. He moved to Kent around 1873–4, leaving the colours to the church at Harrow. He died at Bickley on 15 June 1883.

== Family ==
Parr married in 1846 Harriet Pott, second daughter of Charles Pott of Freelands. Freelands was a house owned by Samuel Scott as part of his Sundridge Park estate, near Bromley, Kent, from 1818. The Pott family were long-term tenants, to 1876.

The children of the marriage included:

- Charles Chase Parr (died 1897, aged 49). He married in 1872 Katherine Anne Millar; their daughter Olive Katherine Parr was the writer Beatrice Chase.
- Alfred Arthur Chase Parr (1849–1914), naval officer. Cape Parr in Antarctica was named after him.
- Willoughby Chase Parr, third son, cleric. Father of Martin Willoughby Parr.
- Percivall Chase Parr, fourth son.
- Harriet Bertha, married 1876 Robert Hebert Quick.
- Emily Oliver, artist.

The Rev. Canon John Owen Parr II (1798–1877), vicar of Preston, Lancashire, was his elder brother. He married firstly in 1821 Maria-Elizabeth Wright, by whom he had nine children; secondly in 1857 his sister-in-law, Mary Emily Pott, youngest surviving daughter of Charles Pott; and thirdly in secret in 1858 his domestic servant, Alice Stewardson, an alliance which was to lead to scandal.
