= Lysine N-acetyltransferase =

Class of enzymes

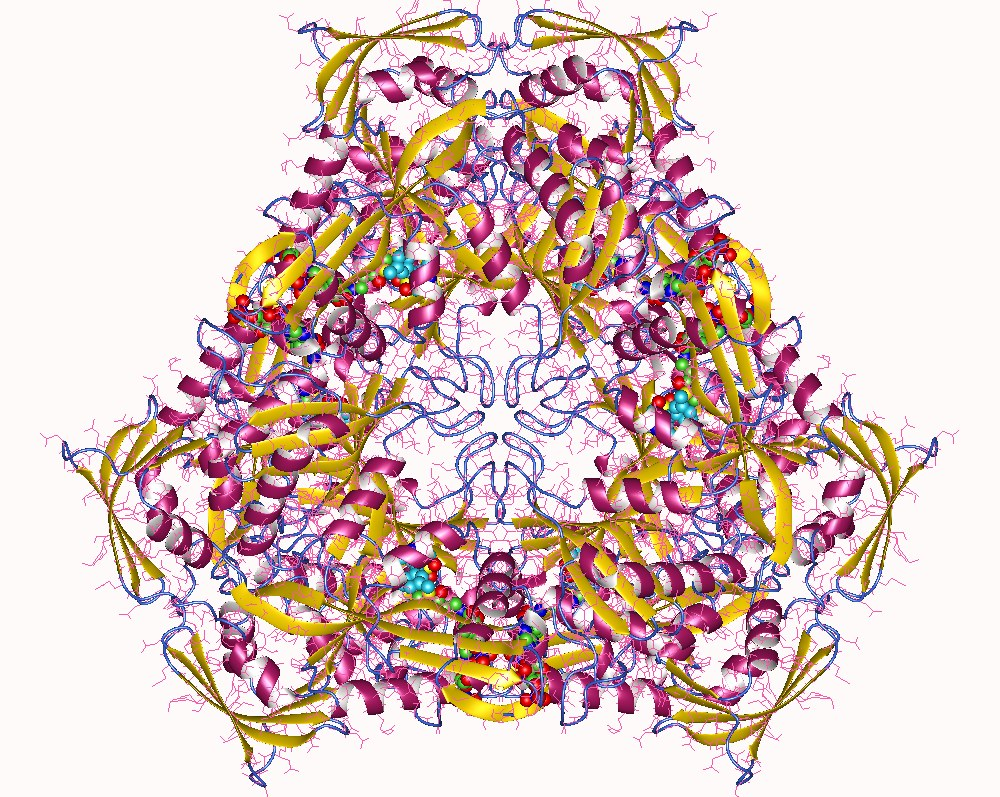
- Lysine N-acetyltransferase (EIS) hexamer, Mycobacterium tuberculosis

Identifiers
- EC no.: 2.3.1.32
- CAS no.: 37257-12-8

Databases
- IntEnz: IntEnz view
- BRENDA: BRENDA entry
- ExPASy: NiceZyme view
- KEGG: KEGG entry
- MetaCyc: metabolic pathway
- PRIAM: profile
- PDB structures: RCSB PDB PDBe PDBsum
- Gene Ontology: AmiGO / QuickGO
Search
- PMC: articles
- PubMed: articles
- NCBI: proteins

Lysine N-acetyltransferase (EC 2.3.1.32) is an enzyme characterised from beef liver that catalyzes the chemical reaction

lysine
+
acetyl phosphate
H_{3}PO_{4}
H_{3}PO_{4}
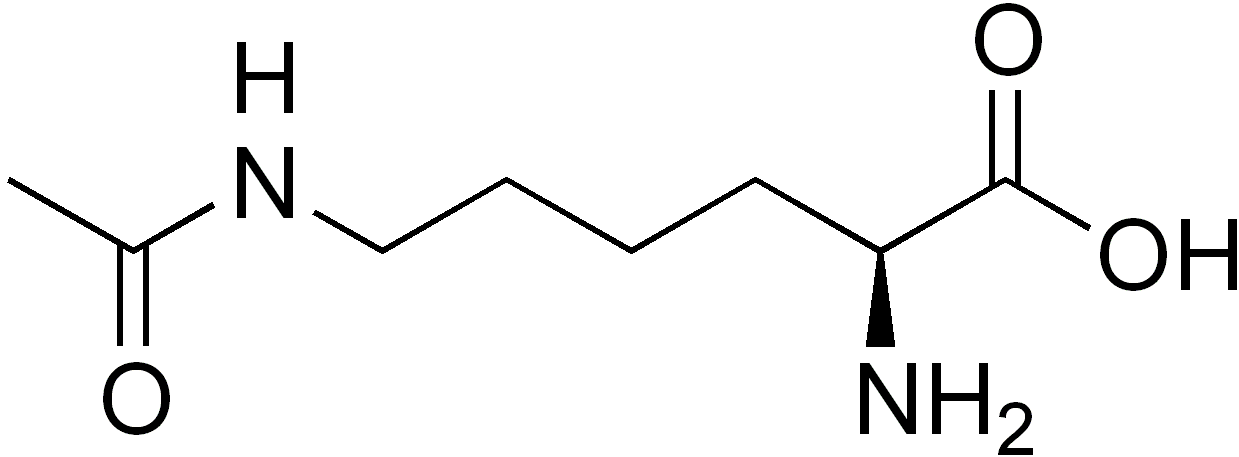
acetyllysine

The two substrates of this enzyme are L-lysine and acetyl phosphate. Its products are acetyllysine and phosphoric acid.

This enzyme belongs to the family of transferases, specifically those acyltransferases transferring groups other than aminoacyl groups. The systematic name of this enzyme class is acetyl-phosphate:L-lysine N6-acetyltransferase. Other names in common use include lysine acetyltransferase, and acetyl-phosphate:L-lysine 6-N-acetyltransferase. This enzyme participates in lysine degradation.
