= Oliver Chase Quick =

English Anglican theologian (1885–1944)

The Reverend Oliver Chase Quick
- Born: 21 June 1885; Sedbergh, England
- Died: 21 January 1944 (aged 58); Longborough, England
- Spouse: Frances Winifred Pearson
- Parents: Robert Hebert Quick; Bertha Parr

Ecclesiastical career
- Religion: Christianity (Anglican)
- Church: Church of England
- Ordained: 1911 (deacon); 1912 (priest)

Academic background
- Education: Corpus Christi College, Oxford

Academic work
- Discipline: Theology; philosophy
- Institutions: Durham University; University of Oxford

Oliver Chase Quick (21 June 1885 – 21 January 1944) was an English theologian, philosopher, and Anglican priest.

== Early life and education ==
Oliver Quick was born on 21 June 1885 in Sedbergh, Yorkshire, the son of the educationist Robert Hebert Quick and Bertha Parr. He was educated at Harrow School and studied classics and theology at Corpus Christi College, Oxford.

Quick married Frances Winifred Pearson, a niece of Karl Pearson.

== Ecclesiastical and academic career ==
Quick was ordained to the diaconate in 1911 and to the priesthood in 1912. Prior to becoming chaplain to the Archbishop of Canterbury in 1915, he was a vice-principal of Leeds Clergy School and then a curate at St Martin-in-the-Fields, London. He was given his first incumbency in 1918 in his appointment to the vicarage of Kenley, Surrey. He went on to be appointed to residentiary canonries of Newcastle (1920), Carlisle (1923), and St Paul's (1930). He became a professor of theology at Durham University in 1934 and was appointed to a canonry of Durham Cathedral ex officio. He moved to Oxford in 1939, having been appointed to the Regius Professorship of Divinity at the University of Oxford, which carried with it a canonry of Christ Church Cathedral. He remained in the post until his death in 1944.

In his works he advocated the doctrines of soul sleep and conditional immortality. He was one of the leading exponents of orthodox Anglicanism and upheld a position similar to that of the authors of Essays Catholic and Critical (1926). He followed systematic and synthetic rather than historical methods and expressed his thought in a modern way.

Quick died on 21 January 1944 in Longborough, Gloucestershire, and was buried four days later in the churchyard in Longborough.

== Published works ==
=== Books ===
- Catholic and Protestant Elements in Christianity. London: Longmans, Green & Co. 1913.
- Modern Philosophy and the Incarnation. London: Society for Promoting Christian Knowledge. 1915.
- Essays in Orthodoxy. London: Macmillan. 1916.
- The Testing of Church Principles. London: John Murray. 1919.
- Liberalism, Modernism and Tradition: Bishop Paddock Lectures, 1922. London: Longmans, Green & Co. 1922.
- Christian Beliefs and Modern Questions (1st ed.). London: SCM Press. 1923.
- Christian Beliefs and Modern Questions (2nd ed.). London: SCM Press. 1924.
- The Christian Sacraments. London: Harper & Brothers Publishers. 1927. (Reissued several times, including a Fontana Library edition in 1964.)
- Philosophy and the Cross. London: Oxford University Press. 1931.
- The Ground of Faith and the Chaos of Thought. London: Nisbet. 1931.
- The Realism of Christ's Parables. London: SCM Press. 1931.
- The Gospel of Divine Action. London: Nisbet. 1933.
- Christian Beliefs and Modern Questions (3rd ed.). London: SCM Press. 1934.
- Christian Beliefs and Modern Questions (4th ed.). London: SCM Press. 1936.
- Doctrines of the Creed: Their Basis in Scripture and Their Meaning To-Day. London: Nisbet. 1938. (Reissued several times including a Fontana Library edition in 1963.)
- Christianity and Justice. London: The Sheldon Press. 1940.
- The Gospel of the New World: A Study in the Christian Doctrine of Atonement. Prefatory memoir by William Temple. Introduction by F. Winifred Quick. London: Nisbet. 1944.

=== Book chapters ===
- "Goodness and Happiness". In A. D. Lindsay. Christianity and the Present Moral Unrest. London: George Allen & Unwin. pp. 73–86. 1926.
- "The Doctrine of the Church of England on Sacraments". In R. Dunkerley. The Ministry and the Sacraments. London: SCM Press. pp. 124–137. 1937.

=== Journal articles ===
- "The Humanist Theory of Value: A Criticism". Mind. 19 (74). Oxford University Press: 218–230. 1910. doi:10.1093/mind/XIX.1.218. ISSN 0026-4423. JSTOR 2248191.
- "The Humanist Theory of Value". Mind. 20 (78). Oxford University Press: 256–257. 1911. doi:10.1093/mind/XX.78.256. ISSN 0026-4423. JSTOR 2248789.
- "Mysticism: Its Meaning and Danger". The Journal of Theological Studies. 14 (53). Oxford University Press: 1–9. 1912. doi:10.1093/jts/os-XIV.1.1. ISSN 0022-5185. JSTOR 23947295.
- "Bergson's 'Creative Evolution' and the Individual". Mind. 22 (4). Oxford University Press: 217–230. 1913. doi:10.1093/mind/XXII.4.217. ISSN 0026-4423. JSTOR 2248801.
- "God as King and Father: Address to the 10th Conference of Modern Churchmen". The Modern Churchman. 13: 409–418. 1923.
- "The Fact and Doctrine of the Resurrection". Anglican Theological Review. 8: 114–123. 1925. ISSN 0003-3286.
- "The Jerusalem Meeting and the Christian Message". International Review of Mission. 17 (3): 417–576. 1928. doi:10.1111/j.1758-6631.1928.tb04485.x. ISSN 1758-6631.
- "Books That Have Influenced Our Epoch: Canon Streeter's 'Reality'". The Expository Times. 40 (8): 344–348. 1929. doi:10.1177/001452462904000802. ISSN 0014-5246. S2CID 169419105.
- "Christian Theology and Moral Principles". The Expository Times. 47 (5): 200–207. 1937. doi:10.1177/001452463704800502. ISSN 0014-5246. S2CID 170926432.
- "Dogmatic Theology". Theology. 38 (226): 246–254. 1939. doi:10.1177/0040571X3903822602. ISSN 0040-571X. S2CID 221074195.
- "Justice and Love". Theology. 39 (229): 5–14. 1939. doi:10.1177/0040571X3903922902. ISSN 0040-571X. S2CID 171886571.
- "The Doctrine Report and the Sacraments". Theology. 39 (233): 344–353. 1939. doi:10.1177/0040571X3903923304. ISSN 0040-571X. S2CID 172037440.

=== Other ===
- Fasting Communion: A Discussion. London: Society for Promoting Christian Knowledge. 1917.
- Some Arguments for the New Prayer Book. London: League of Loyalty and Order. 1927.
- Religion and Science as Ways of Knowledge. Edinburgh: T. and T. Clark. 1933.
