= Jean Beggs =

British geneticist (born 1950)

Jean Beggs CBE FRS FRSE DSc
- Born: Jean Duthie Lancaster; 16 April 1950 (age 76)
- Education: Glasgow High School for Girls; University of Glasgow
- Known for: Molecular biology, cell biology, genetics
- Spouse: Dr Ian Beggs
- Children: 2 sons
- Awards: FRSE (1995); FRS (1998); CBE (2006)
- Scientific career
- Fields: Gene cloning in yeast, RNA splicing
- Workplaces: Wellcome Trust; University of Edinburgh; Imperial College

Jean Duthie Beggs (née Lancaster, born 16 April 1950) is a Scottish geneticist. She is the Royal Society Darwin Trust Professor in the Wellcome Trust Centre for Cell Biology at the University of Edinburgh.

== Biography ==
Beggs was born Jean Duthie Lancaster on 16 April 1950 to Jean Crawford (née Duthie) and William Renfrew Lancaster. She attended Glasgow High School for Girls. She graduated from the University of Glasgow with a BSc (Hons) in Biochemistry in 1971, and received her PhD from the university in 1974. From 1974 to 1977 she held a postdoctoral position in the Department of Molecular Biology at the University of Edinburgh working with Professors Kenneth and Noreen Murray. Having received a Beit Memorial Fellowship for Medical Research, Beggs moved to the Plant Breeding Institute in Cambridge, working there for two years. In 1979, she began work as a lecturer in the Department of Biochemistry at Imperial College London. In 1985, Beggs returned to the University of Edinburgh's Molecular Biology department at Edinburgh, where she was appointed Professor of Molecular Biology in 1999.

Her research interests are in RNA splicing.

In 1972 she married Dr Ian Beggs. They have two sons.

== Awards and honours ==
She has been a Fellow of the Royal Society of Edinburgh since 1995 and was elected a Fellow of the Royal Society in 1998.

In 2003, she was awarded the Royal Society's Gabor Medal "for her contributions to the isolation and manipulation of recombinant DNA molecules in a eukaryotic organism, adding a new dimension to molecular and cellular biology".

She received a CBE in the 2006 Queen's Birthday Honours for her services to science.

She was the Royal Society of Edinburgh Vice President for Life Sciences from 2009 to 2012.

In 2016 she was awarded an honorary DSc by the University of St Andrews.

In 2018 RNA Society Lifetime Achievement Award.
