= David Keilin =

British entomologist

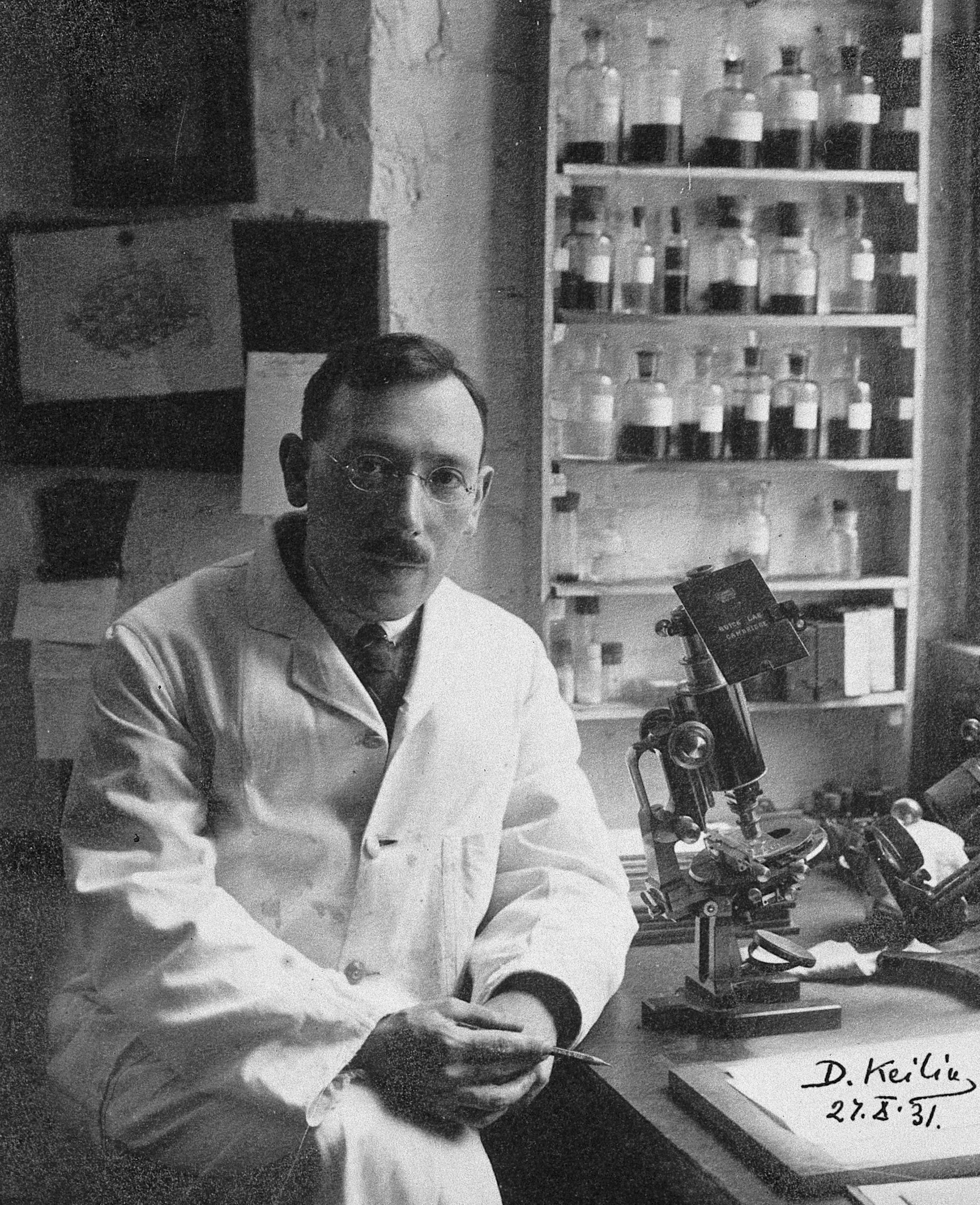
- David Keilin in 1931
- Born: 21 March 1887; Moscow
- Died: 27 February 1963 (aged 75); Cambridge
- Education: University of Liège; Magdalene College, Cambridge
- Known for: Cytochrome
- Awards: Fellow of the Royal Society; Royal Medal (1939); Copley Medal (1951)
- Scientific career
- Fields: Entomology and parasitology
- Workplaces: University of Cambridge
- Doctoral advisor: George Nuttall
- Author abbrev. (botany)

David Keilin FRS (21 March 1887 – 27 February 1963) was a British Jewish scientist focusing mainly on entomology.

== Background and education ==
He was born in Moscow in 1887 and his family returned to Warsaw early in his youth. He did not attend school until age ten due to ill health and asthma. Only seven years later, in 1904, he enrolled in the University of Liège. He later studied at Magdalene College, Cambridge, and became a British citizen.

== Career ==
Keilin became research assistant to George Nuttall, first Quick Professor of Biology at the University of Cambridge, in 1915, and spent the rest of his career there, succeeding Nuttall as Quick Professor and director of the Molteno Institute in 1931. He retired in 1962.

He made extensive contributions to entomology and parasitology during his career. He published thirty-nine papers between 1914 and 1923 on the reproduction of lice, the life-cycle of the horse bot-fly, the respiratory adaptations in fly larvae, and other subjects.

He is most known for his research and rediscovery of cytochrome in the 1920s (he invented the name). It had been discovered by C. A. MacMunn in 1884, but that discovery had been forgotten or misunderstood.

== Awards and honours ==
Keilin was elected a Fellow of the Royal Society in 1926. He won its Royal Medal in 1939 and its Copley Medal in 1951.

== Legacy ==
The Keilin Memorial Lecture of the Biochemical Society began in 1964 in his memory, and recipients and the subject of their talk is selected by a committee reflecting Keilin's interests in bioenergetics, electron transfer and mitochondrial biology. A medal with his profile, a financial award and an opportunity for research publication is also awarded. In 2020, the recipient was the University of Cambridge's Prof Judy Hirst.
