= George Nuttall =

American-British bacteriologist

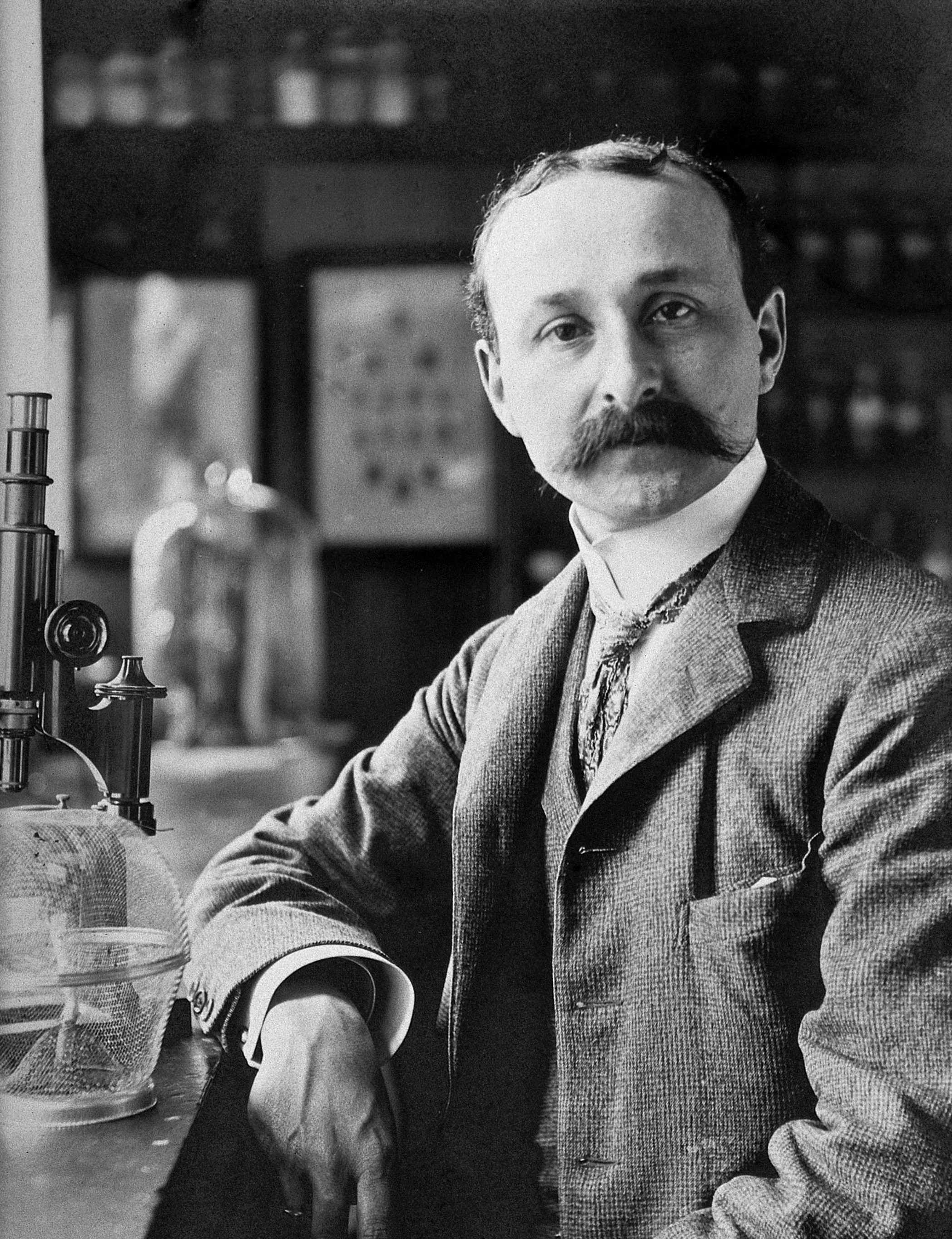
- George Nuttall in 1901
- Born: George Henry Falkiner Nuttall; 5 July 1862; San Francisco, California, U.S.
- Died: 16 December 1937 (aged 75)
- Education: University of California, Berkeley (M.D.) University of Göttingen (Ph.D)
- Scientific career
- Fields: bacteriology
- Workplaces: University of Cambridge

George Henry Falkiner Nuttall FRS (5 July 1862 – 16 December 1937) was an American-British bacteriologist who contributed much to the knowledge of parasites and of insect carriers of diseases. He made significant innovative discoveries in immunology, about life under aseptic conditions, in blood chemistry, and about diseases transmitted by arthropods, especially ticks. He carried out investigations into the distribution of Anopheline mosquitoes in England in relation to the previous prevalence of malaria there. With William Welch he identified the organism responsible for causing gas gangrene.

== Life ==
Nuttall was born in San Francisco, the second of three sons and two daughters of Robert Kennedy Nuttall, a British doctor who had migrated to San Francisco in 1850, and Magdalena, daughter of John Parrott of San Francisco. In 1865 the family moved to Europe. The children were educated in England, France, Germany and Switzerland. As a result, Nuttall spoke German, French, Italian and Spanish, which was extremely useful in his later career. Nuttall returned to the United States in 1878, obtaining his M.D. degree from the University of California, Berkeley in 1884. He then travelled with some of his family to Mexico for a year. His sister Zelia became a noted archaeologist and anthropologist of early Mexican cultures.

After a short period working at Johns Hopkins University in Baltimore under H. Newell Martin, he went to Göttingen in 1886 working with Carl Flügge and others. His research in Göttingen included studies on mechanisms of immunity. He received his PhD in zoology in 1890. After a year travelling he returned to Baltimore, working under William H. Welch and becoming associate in hygiene in 1892. He worked on the tubercle bacillus and identified the bacillus responsible for gas gangrene, now known as Clostridium perfringens.

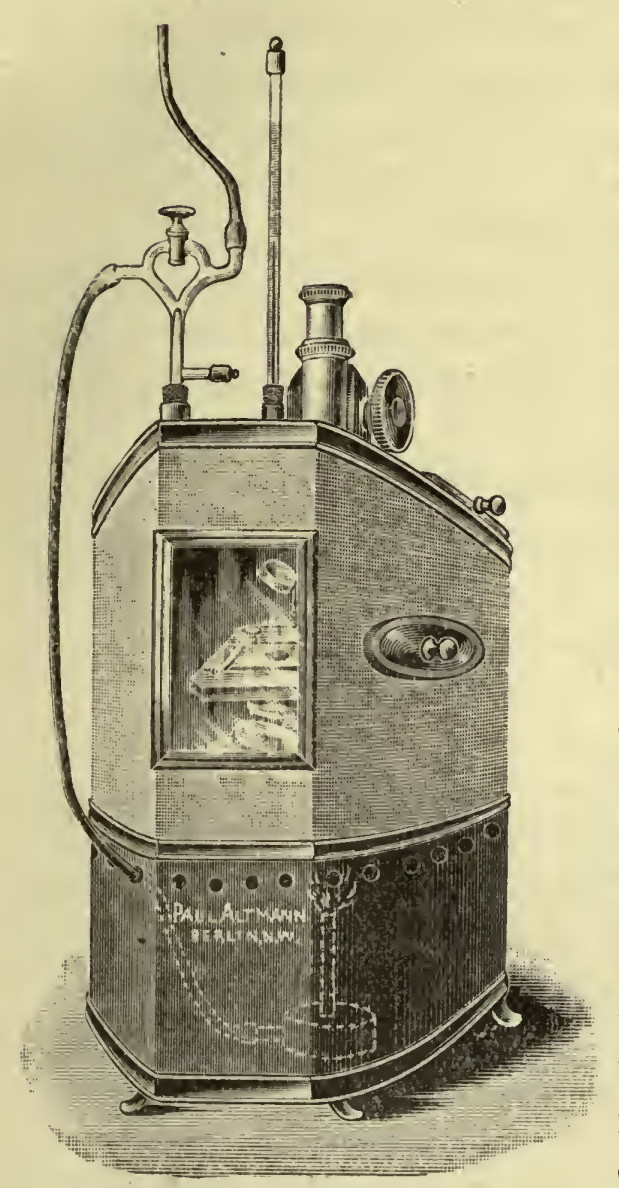
Nuttall's Microscopic Thermostat

From 1892 to 1899 Nuttall was in Germany once more, first in Göttingen, then in Berlin, where he worked at the Hygienic Institute (hygienischen Institut). In 1893 He published Hygienic Measures in Relation to Infectious Diseases, a book dealing with cleanliness, disinfection and fumigation in medical practice. He married Paula von Oertzen-Kittendorf in 1895. Working with Hans Thierfelder he developed methods for rearing guinea pigs under aseptic conditions, with no gut bacteria. This work laid the foundation for the field of Gnotobiosis, the study of organisms with known micro-organism populations. In 1895 he designed a microscopic thermostat for maintaining biological materials under study at a constant temperature. This was used for many years. During this period his interest in the role of insects in transmission of disease developed, which would continue to be a major topic of research.

In May 1899 Nuttall travelled to Cambridge at the invitation of Clifford Allbutt, Regius Professor of Physic at the University, and gave a series of lectures in bacteriology. In 1900 he was appointed university lecturer in bacteriology and preventive medicine, and would be based in Cambridge for the rest of his life. He founded and edited the Journal of Hygiene, the first volume being published in 1901. His research at this period was in two main areas, studies of blood, in particular immune reactions, and studies on transmission of disease by arthropods, in particular mosquitoes and malaria with Arthur Shipley. In 1904 Nuttall and Shipley were both elected Fellows of the Royal Society. In the same year he and Patrick Manson established in Cambridge the first Diploma in Tropical Medicine and Hygiene, which continued until 1933.

In 1906 he was elected the first Quick Professor of Biology at Cambridge, a chair established for the study of protozoology. He built a substantial team within the Quick Laboratory working on many areas of parasitology. A major topic was piroplasmosis and related malaria-like parasites transmitted by ticks, mainly in dogs, but also in other animals including humans. The number of published papers on parasitology was steadily increasing, and in 1908 Nuttall founded the journal Parasitology, initially as a supplement to the Journal of Hygiene, but soon as a separate journal. Cox (2009) argues that the founding of the journal was a key event in the development of parasitology as a discipline in its own right. In the same year Nuttall co-edited an important book on the bacteriology of diphtheria with Graham-Smith. Also in 1908 he was elected a fellow of Magdalen College. During World War I he began to investigate lice. This began in response to the practical problems with lice in the troops, but developed over the next few years into research on their biology and role in disease.

In 1919 Nuttall appealed for funds to create an Institute for Parasitical Research in Cambridge. Percy Molteno and his wife donated the sum of £30,000 for this purpose. The Molteno Institute for Research in Parasitology was opened in 1921 with Nuttall as its first director. The Quick Department was transferred to the Molteno Institute.

His writings include some 150 articles in professional journals. After the establishment of the Molteno Institute, Nuttall became increasingly occupied with administration and fundraising, and published few papers. His wife Paula died in 1922. One publication from this period is a biographical note on German scientists of an earlier generation who he had known. He resigned the Quick Professorshipin 1931, and became emeritus Professor of Biology. He died suddenly in December 1937, and was survived by two sons, George and Winfred, and a daughter Carmelita.

== Mechanisms of Immunity ==
In the early 1880s, Metchnikoff had observed phagocytosis of bacteria and other foreign matter by animal cells including leucocytes in mammals, and proposed that this was the mechanism by which animals protect themselves against infection. This idea was controversial at the time. Josef von Fodor had shown an apparent germicidal action of blood against anthrax bacilli, but critics suggested that the bacilli were being entrapped by clotting rather than destroyed. Nuttall, carried out a series of experiments with defibrinated blood from various species, and clearly established the germicidal action of blood in the absence of clotting, and also that the germicidal action was lost after the blood was heated to 55 °C. These results formed the basis of the humoral theory of immunity, as opposed to the cellular theory of Metchnikoff, and also stimulated the work that led to the development of antitoxin therapy, particularly for diphtheria and tetanus. Initially the humoral and cellular theories were seen as rival explanations of immunity, but it soon became clear that processes of both kinds occur and complement one another.

== Phylogenetic relationships ==
Darwin's theory of Evolution - descent with modification - provided a theoretical basis for classification in biology, species within a taxon sharing a more or less recent common ancestor. For nearly half a century, the only criteria for classification remained morphological, as had been the case with pre-evolutionary systems such as that of Linnaeus. Classification based on morphology has two main limitations: difficulty in dealing with convergent evolution where similar forms arise in species that are not closely related; and an inability to provide a quantitative measure of relatedness. The precipitin reaction was first described by Rudolf Kraus in 1897, an insoluble product being formed in an antigen-antibody interaction. The reaction was at first thought to be specific, but it was soon found that while the protein used to generate the antibody gave the strongest reaction, related proteins could give lesser reactions. This finding was developed by Nuttall into a quantitative method in which the amount of precipitate was measured. Using serum from a wide variety of animals he was able to show that the degree of immune reaction between species indicated the relationship between them. In a major work Blood immunity and blood relationship Nuttall and his colleagues presented the data from over 16,000 tests with serum from a wide range of animal species, both vertebrate and invertebrate. This work was the starting point for the field of molecular evolution.

== Arthropods as disease vectors ==
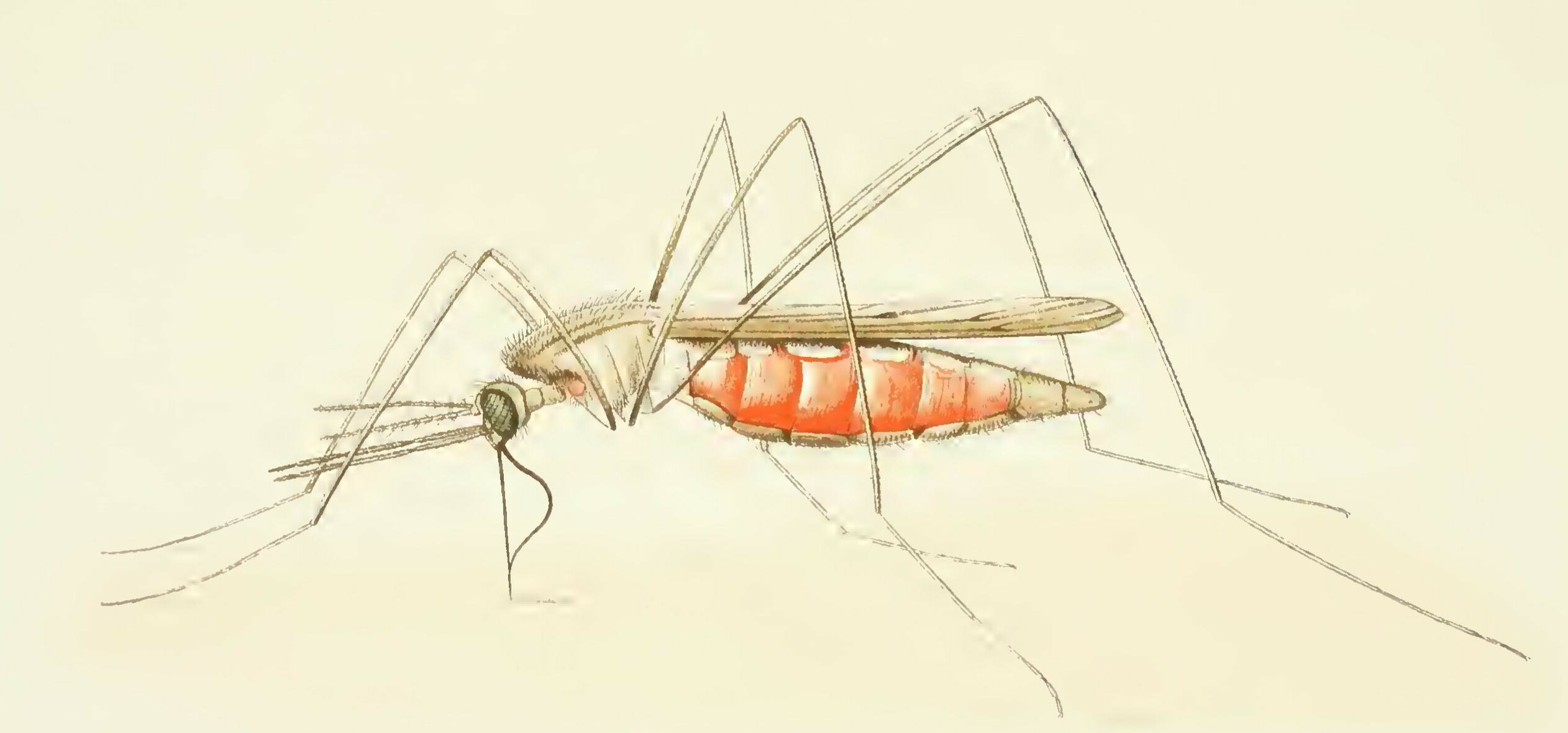
Anopheles maculipennis feeding. From Nuttall & Shipley (1901)

In 1900 Nuttall and Austen published a book reviewing the evidence for transmission of disease by Insects, Arachnids and Myriapods, which included a discussion of the mosquito theory of malaria. Malaria had formerly been common in England, but few if any cases still occurred in 1900. Nuttall and colleagues carried out a survey of the distribution of the Anopheles mosquito in England, showing a concentration in the areas where malaria (ague) had previously been prevalent. The study suffered from the limitation of not distinguishing between the various species of mosquito, but its presentation, including maps, was one of the first of its kind. Nuttall and Shipley subsequently published a series of papers in The Journal of Hygiene on the structure and biology of Anopheles (1901–1903), which represented the most detailed study on the topic up to that time.

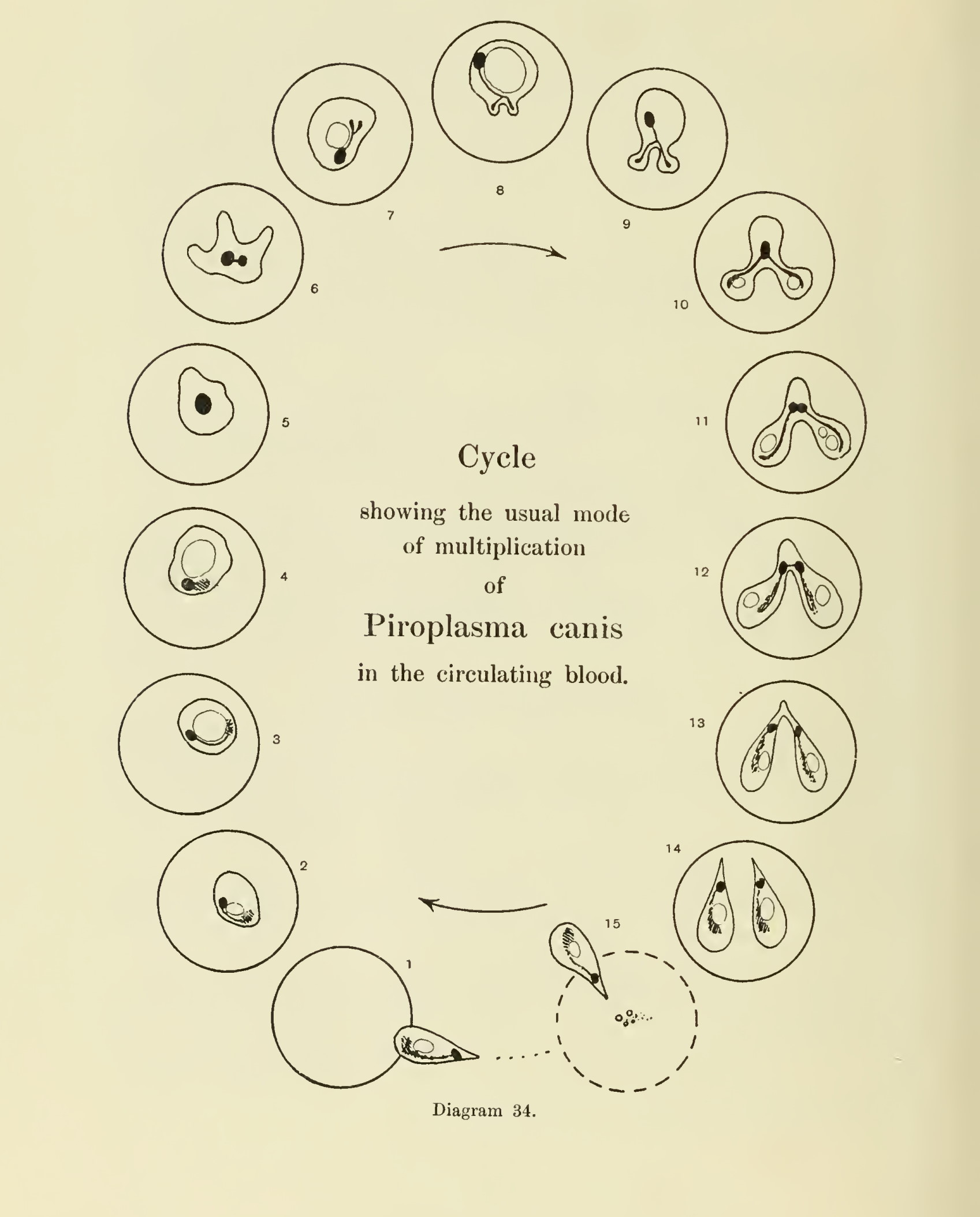
Piroplasma canis multiplication in the blood. From Nuttall & Graham-Smith (1907)

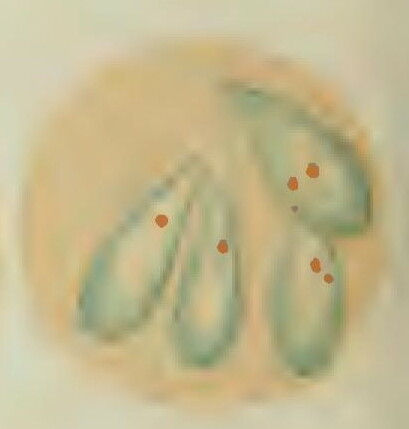
Four Piroplasma canis parasites within a dog's red blood cell. From Nuttall & Graham-Smith (1905)

Nuttall began working on ticks and tick-transmitted diseases in 1904. His first studies were with canine piroplasmosis. Piroplasmosis, or babesiosis, unknown in Britain, is a malaria-like disease caused by a protozoan parasite. At one stage in its life-cycle the parasite is pyriform (pear-shaped), hence the name piroplasmosis. It affects a wide variety of wild and domestic animals. Human cases occur, but are uncommon. Smith and Kilborne identified the parasite in Texas cattle fever, and established that it was transmitted by ticks, the first proven case of arthropod disease transmission. In a series of papers published with Graham-Smith in The Journal of Hygiene (1904–1907) Nuttall described the nature of the disease and the multiplication of the parasite in the blood of dogs. Subsequent work with Seymour Hadwen led to the discovery that trypan blue was an effective treatment both in dogs and cattle. This was a finding of great economic importance, and trypan blue became the standard treatment for piroplasmosis/babesiosis for many years.

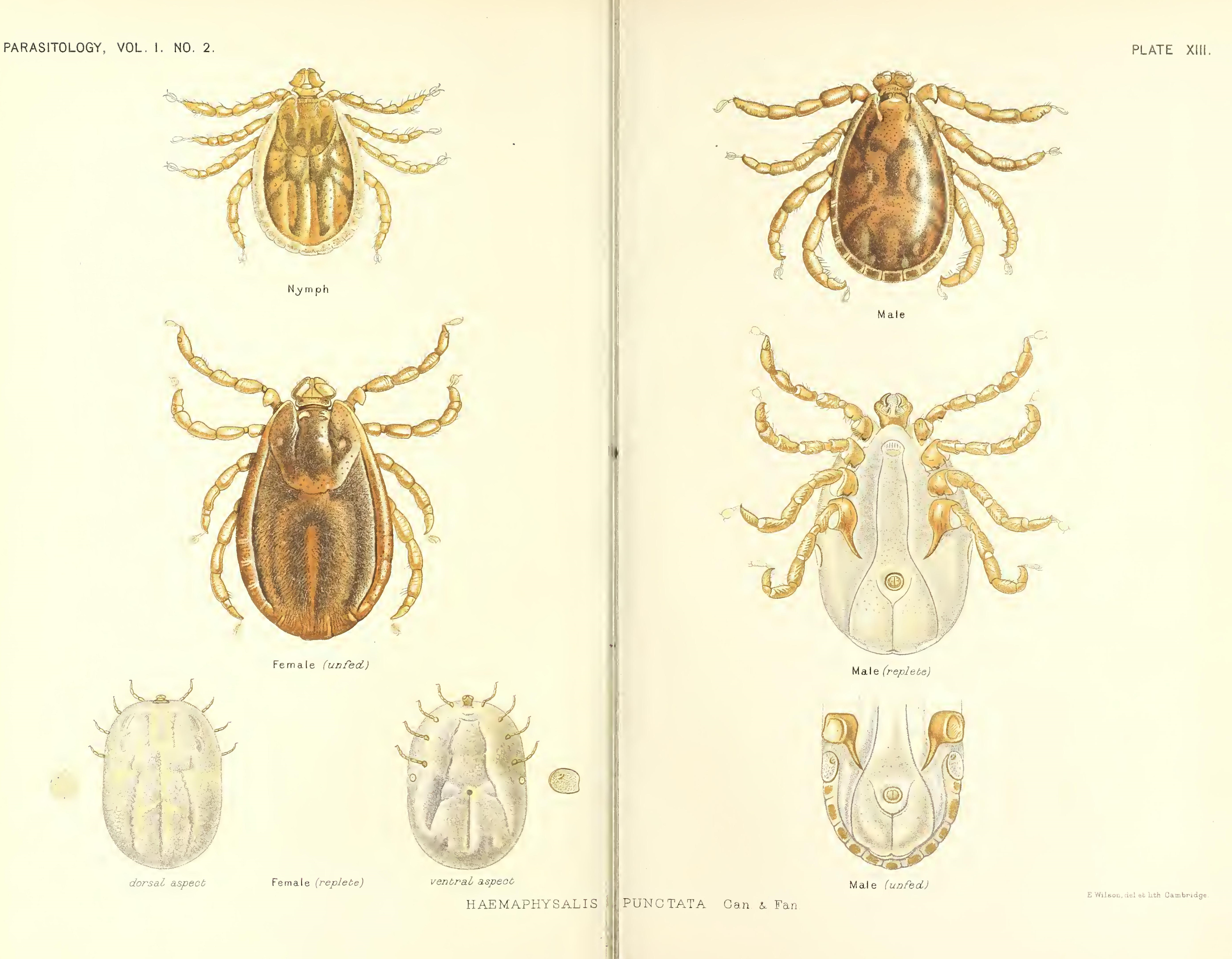
The tick Haemaphysalis punctata. From Nuttall et al. (1908)

Nuttall made extensive studies on ticks in collaboration with Cecil Warburton L.E. Robinson and F.W. Cooper. This led to numerous papers and an exhaustive monograph that appeared in three parts between 1908 and 1915. The publications, mostly in the journal Parasitology cover the anatomy, biology and classification of ticks, as well as observations on the diseases they transmit, including "tick paralysis". In the course of this work, Nuttall accumulated a very large collection of ticks from many parts of the world. The collection is now in the Natural History Museum, London.

Another arthropod, that became increasingly important during World War I was the louse. Nuttall, carried out a series of studies that, as with many of his other researches, combined a theoretical and zoological approach with practical concerns.

== Parasites named for him ==
- Nuttallia — this name was given to a genus of piroplasms. However the name was found to be pre-occupied by a genus of North American bivalves and the generic name now used for the piroplasms is Babesia.
- Nuttalliellidae — Tick family found in southern Africa The family has a single species, Nuttalliella namaqua.
- Rhipicentor nuttalli Cooper, Cantab & Robinson, 1908 - Nuttall created the genus Rhipicentor, this species was named for him by his contemporaries.
- Dermacentor nuttalli Olenev, 1929
- Ixodes nuttalli Lahille, 1913
- Ixodes nuttallianus Schulze, 1930
- Amblyomma nuttalli Dönitz, 1909
