= List of women fellows of the Royal Society =

Female fellows of the Royal Society
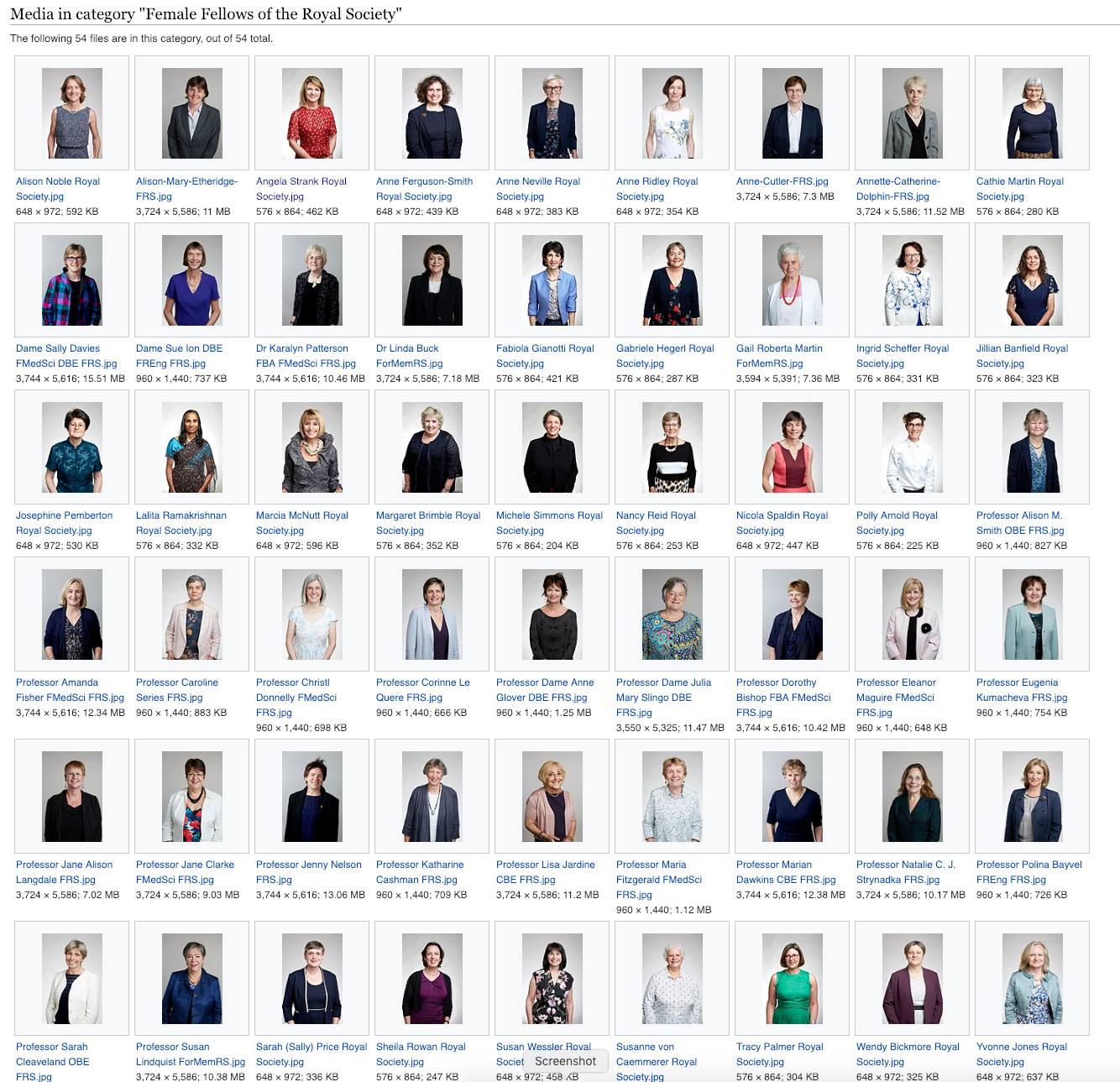
- Female fellows of the Royal Society elected from 2014 to 2018
- Awarded for: Contributions to the improvement of natural knowledge”
- Sponsored by: Royal Society
- Date: 1945
- Location: London
- Country: United Kingdom
- Total percentage of fellows: Since Kathleen Lonsdale and Marjory Stephenson in 1945, around 9% of fellows of the Royal Society are women.
- Website: royalsociety.org/fellows

Fellowship of the Royal Society is open to scientists, engineers and technologists from the United Kingdom and Commonwealth of Nations, on the basis of having made "a substantial contribution to the improvement of natural knowledge, including mathematics, engineering science and medical science". Election to the Fellowship is highly regarded and sought after, bringing academic prestige to both the individual and the institution with which they are associated. For scientists in the United Kingdom, the recognition is considered second only to the award of a Nobel Prize.

While there was no explicit prohibition of women as Fellow of the Royal Society in its original charters and statutes, election to the fellowships was for much of the Society's history de facto closed to women. As a result of the dissolution of nunneries in connection with the Dissolution of the Monasteries by Henry VIII, and female exclusion from schools and universities, the formal education of British girls and women was effectively non-existent throughout the 17th and 18th centuries. Women slowly gained admittance to learned societies in the UK starting in the 19th century, with the founding of the Zoological Society of London in 1829 and the Royal Entomological Society in 1833, both of which admitted women fellows from their inception.

The question of women being admitted to the Royal Society was first recorded in 1900, when Marian Farquharson, the first female fellow of the Royal Microscopical Society, wrote to the Council of the Royal Society petitioning that "duly qualified women should have the advantage of full fellowship". The Council replied that the question of women fellows "must depend on the interpretation to be placed upon the Royal Charters under which the Society has been governed for more than three hundred years". When Hertha Ayrton was nominated for fellowship in 1902, her candidature was turned down on the basis that as a married woman she had no standing in law. The Sex Disqualification (Removal) Act 1919 made it illegal for an incorporated society to refuse admission on the grounds of an individual's sex or marital status. While the Society acknowledged the provision of section 1 of the Act in 1925, in reply to a question originally put to them by the Women's Engineering Society three years earlier, it was not until 1943 that another woman was nominated for fellowship. Kathleen Lonsdale and Marjory Stephenson were duly elected in 1945, after a postal vote amending the Society's statutes to explicitly allow women fellows.

As of 2020, a total of 198 women have been elected fellows. Two women have been elected under the Society's former Statute 12 regulation and two Honorary Fellows for their service to the cause of science. Another four women, from the British Royal Family, have been either Royal Fellow or Patron of the Society. Thirty six more women have been elected as Foreign Members. Of the approximately 1,600 living fellows and foreign members in 2018, 8.5 per cent are women compared to 0.4% in 1945, according to a historical research project conducted by Aileen Fyfe and Camilla Mørk Røstvik.

== Fellows ==
List of female fellows
Year of election	Image	Fellow	Field(s)	Notes	Ref.
1945	Kathleen Lonsdale in 1968	Kathleen Lonsdale	Crystallography	Awarded the Davy Medal in 1957	
1945		Marjory Stephenson	Biochemistry, microbiology		
1946		Agnes Arber	Botany	Awarded the Linnean Medal in 1948	
1947	Mary Cartwright	Mary Cartwright	Mathematics	Awarded the Sylvester Medal in 1964 and the De Morgan Medal in 1968	
1947	Portrait of Dorothy Hodgkin	Dorothy Hodgkin	Biochemistry	Awarded the Royal Medal in 1956, the Nobel Prize in Chemistry in 1964, and the Copley Medal in 1976. Delivered the Tercentenary Lecture in 1960 and the Bakerian Lecture in 1972.	
1947		Muriel Robertson	Protozoology, bacteriology		
1948		Sidnie Manton	Entomology	Awarded the Linnean Medal in 1963 and the Frink Medal in 1977; her sister Irene Manton was elected FRS in 1961	
1948		Dorothy Needham	Biochemistry		
1952	Honor Fell at her microscope in the 1950s	Honor Fell	Zoology	Awarded the Grand Prix Charles-Leopold Mayer in 1965	
1952		Marthe Vogt	Neurology	Awarded the Royal Medal in 1981	
1954		Rosalind Pitt-Rivers	Biochemistry		
1956		Helen Porter	Plant physiology		
1957		Charlotte Auerbach	Zoology, genetics	Awarded the Keith Medal in 1945, the Darwin Medal in 1976 and the Mendel Medal in 1977	
1958		Edith Bülbring	Pharmacology		
1959		Ann Bishop	Protozoology, parasitology		
1959		Sylvia Tait	Endocrinology		
1961	Portrait of Irene Manton	Irene Manton	Botany	Awarded the Linnean Medal in 1969 and the Schleiden Medal in 1973; her sister Sidnie Manton was elected FRS in 1948	
1963		Sheina Marshall	Marine biology		
1964		Eleanor Margaret Burbidge	Astrophysics	Awarded the Henry Norris Russell Lectureship in 1984 and the Gold Medal of the Royal Astronomical Society in 2005	
1965	Dorothy Hill on geological excursions in the Brisbane Valley, 1928-1929	Dorothy Hill	Geology	Awarded the Lyell Medal in 1964, the Clarke Medal in 1966, the Mueller Medal in 1967, the W. R. Browne Medal in 1981 and the ANZAAS Medal in 1983	
1966	Mary Pickford	Lillian Mary Pickford	Endocrinology		
1967		Emmeline Jean Hanson	Biophysics		
1969		Winifred Watkins	Biochemistry	Awarded the Paul Ehrlich and Ludwig Darmstaedter Prize in 1969 and the Royal Medal in 1988	
1971		Florence Gwendolen Rees	Zoology, parasitology	Awarded the Linnean Medal in 1990	
1972		Mary Parke	Phycology		
1972		Ruth Sanger	Hematology, serology	Awarded the Gairdner Award in 1972	
1973		Brigitte Askonas	Immunology	Awarded the Robert Koch Gold Medal in 2007	
1973	Mary Lyon in 2010	Mary Lyon	Genetics	Awarded the Royal Medal in 1984, the William Allan Award in 1986 and the Wolf Prize in Medicine in 1997	
1975		Anne McLaren	Developmental biology, genetics	Foreign Secretary and vice-president of the Royal Society 1991–96; awarded the Royal Medal in 1990 and the Japan Prize in 2002	
1976		Patricia Clarke	Biochemistry	Delivered the Leeuwenhoek Lecture in 1979	
1976		Elsie Widdowson	Nutrition		
1977		Helen Muir	Rheumatology		
1979	Brenda Milner at TEDxMcGill, 2011	Brenda Milner	Neuropsychology	Delivered the Humphry Davy Lecture in 1989. Awarded the Karl Spencer Lashley Award in 1979, the NAS Award in the Neurosciences in 2004, the Gairdner Award in 2005, the Balzan Prize for Cognitive Neurosciences in 2009 and the Kavli Prize in Neuroscience in 2014	
1979		Winifred Tutin	Botany		
1979	Janet Vaughan	Janet Vaughan	Physiology		
1979		Janet Watson	Geology	Awarded the Lyell Medal in 1973 and the Clough Medal in 1979	
1982	Noreen Murray	Noreen Murray	Molecular genetics	Vice-president of the Royal Society 2002–04, and awarded the Gabor Medal in 1989	
1985	Taken at the Witness Seminar “Post penicillin antibiotics” held by the History of Twentieth Century Medicine Group	Naomi Datta	Genetics		
1985	Appearing on television programme After Dark in 1988	Miriam Rothschild	Entomology, botany	Awarded the H. H. Bloomer Award in 1968	
1985		Anne Warner	Developmental biology		
1986		Jean Thomas	Biochemistry	Biological Secretary and vice-president of the Royal Society 2008–present	
1986		Elizabeth Warrington	Neuropsychology		
1987		Olga Kennard	Crystallography	Awarded the Ewald Prize in 2021	
1988		Barbara Pearse	Molecular biology	Awarded the EMBO Gold Medal in 1987	
1989	Anne Treisman	Anne Treisman	Psychology	Awarded the Golden Brain Award in 1996, the Grawemeyer Award in Psychology in 2009, and the National Medal of Science in Behavioral and Social Science in 2011	
1990		Louise Johnson	Biochemistry, crystallography		
1990		Carole Jordan	Astronomy		
1991		Enid MacRobbie	Biophysics		
1992	Elizabeth Blackburn in 2009	Elizabeth Blackburn	Molecular biology	Awarded the Nobel Prize in Physiology or Medicine in 2009	
1992		Suzanne Cory	Genetics	Awarded the Australia Prize in 1998, the L'Oréal-UNESCO For Women in Science Award in 2001, the Royal Medal in 2002 and the Pearl Meister Greengard Prize in 2009.	
1993		Patricia Jacobs	Genetics	Awarded the March of Dimes Prize in Developmental Biology in 2011 and the William Allan Award in 1981	
1994	Dusa McDuff in 2009	Dusa McDuff	Mathematics	Awarded the Satter Prize in 1991 and the Sylvester Medal in 2018	
1995	Polymer physics pioneer pushes women in STEM (Courtesy of Oak Ridge National Laboratory, U.S. Dept. of Energy)	Julia Higgins	Polymer science	Foreign Secretary and vice-president of the Royal Society 2001–06. Delivered the Blackett and Jagdish Chandra Bose Memorial Lecture in 2005 and the Humphry Davy and Claude Bernard Lecture in 2007. Awarded the Holweck Prize in 2006 and the Sir Frank Whittle Medal in 2020.	
1995	Shirley Tilghman in 2006	Shirley Tilghman	Molecular biology	Awarded the L'Oréal-UNESCO For Women in Science Awards in 2002 and the Genetics Society of America Medal in 2007	
1996		Jan Anderson	Biology	Awarded the Lemberg Medal in 1983 and the Centenary Medal in 2001	
1996		Dianne Edwards	Paleobotany	Awarded the Lyell Medal in 2004	
1996		Linda Partridge	Genetics, biogerontology	Delivered the Croonian Lecture in 2009	
1997	Philippa Marrack in 1992	Philippa Marrack	Immunology	Awarded the Wellcome Foundation Prize in 1990, the L'Oréal-UNESCO For Women in Science Awards in 2004 and the Wolf Prize in Medicine in 2015	
1998		Jean Beggs	Genetics	Awarded the Gabor Medal in 2003	
1998		Cheryll Tickle	Developmental biology		
1999		Frances Ashcroft	Physiology	Awarded the L'Oréal-UNESCO For Women in Science Awards in 2012 and the Croonian Medal and Lecture in 2013	
1999		Rosa Beddington	Developmental biology		
1999	Lorna Casselton in 2010	Lorna Casselton	Genetics	Foreign Secretary and vice-president of the Royal Society 2006–11. Delivered the Rutherford Memorial Lecture in 2008 and the Blackett and Jagdish Chandra Bose Memorial Lecture in 2009	
1999	Athene Donald at the NIMR Wikipedia edit-a-thon on 25 July 2013	Athene Donald	Physics	Delivered the Bakerian Lecture in 2006. Awarded the Nevill Mott Medal and Prize in 2009, the Institute of Physics Michael Faraday Medal and Prize in 2010 and the L'Oréal-UNESCO For Women in Science Awards in 2009	
1999	Portrait of Janet Thornton	Janet Thornton	Bioinformatics		
2000		Janet Rossant	Developmental biology	Awarded the Ross G. Harrison Prize in 2013, the Canada Gairdner Wightman Award in 2015 and the L'Oréal-UNESCO For Women in Science Awards in 2018	
2000		Patricia Simpson	Developmental biology		
2001		Brigid Hogan	Developmental biology		
2001	Frances Kirwan in 2009	Frances Kirwan	Mathematics		
2001		Sheila Sherlock	Medicine		
2002		Anne Dell	Biochemistry		
2002		Judith Howard	Chemistry, crystallography		
2002	Georgina Mace, Bilbao, Spain at the BBVA award ceremony	Georgina Mace	Conservation biology, ecology		
2002		Mary Rees	Mathematics		
2003	Portrait of Jocelyn Bell Burnell	Jocelyn Bell Burnell	Astrophysics	Awarded the Michael Faraday Prize in 2010	
2003		Mariann Bienz	Molecular biology		
2003		Kay Davies	Genetics		
2003		Eleanor Dodson	Biochemistry		
2003	Ann Dowling in 2011	Ann Dowling	Mechanical engineering		
2003	Bridget Ogilvy in 1987	Bridget Ogilvie	Parasitology		
2003	Elizabeth Robertson is a British developmental biologist	Elizabeth Robertson	Cell biology		
2003		Karen Vousden	Molecular biology		
2003		Fiona Watt	Molecular biology		
2004		Caroline Dean	Botany		
2004		Lynn Gladden	Chemical engineering	Awarded the Bakerian Lecture for 2014	
2004	a photo of Carol Robinson giving a speech during the ASMS Day	Carol Robinson	Chemistry	Awarded the Rosalind Franklin Award in 2004, and the Davy Medal in 2010	
2004		Nancy Rothwell	Biology		
2005		Deborah Charlesworth	Evolutionary biology		
2005	Uta Frith in 2012	Uta Frith	Developmental psychology		
2006		Valerie Beral	Epidemiology		
2006		Ruth Lynden-Bell	Computational chemistry		
2006		Trudy Mackay	Genetics		
2006		Helen Saibil	Molecular biology		
2007		Gillian Bates	Biology	Delivered the GlaxoSmithKline Prize and Lecture in 1998	
2007	Rosemary Grant with hummingbird	Barbara Rosemary Grant	Evolutionary biology	Awarded the Darwin Medal in 2002	
2007	Ottoline Leyser	Ottoline Leyser	Botany	Awarded the Rosalind Franklin Award in 2007	
2007		Daniela Rhodes	Molecular biology		
2007		Veronica van Heyningen	Genetics		
2008	Anne O'Garra at the NIMR Wikipedia edit-a-thon on 25 July 2013	Anne O'Garra	Immunology		
2008		Ulrike Tillmann	Mathematics		
2009		Jennifer Clack	Palaeontology, evolutionary biology		
2009	Wendy Hall in 2011	Wendy Hall	Computer science		
2009		Christine Holt	Developmental neuroscience		
2009	Angela McLean	Angela McLean	Mathematical biology	Awarded the Gabor Medal in 2011	
2009		Karen Steel	Biology		
2010		Andrea Brand	Molecular biology	Awarded the Rosalind Franklin Award in 2006	
2010	Eleanor Campbell	Eleanor Campbell	Physical chemistry		
2010	Nicky Clayton	Nicola Clayton	Comparative cognition		
2010	Victoria M Kaspi	Victoria Kaspi	Astrophysics	Delivered the UK-Canada Rutherford Lecture in 2010	
2010		Elizabeth Simpson	Biology		
2011		Doreen Cantrell	Immunology		
2011	Clare Grey	Clare Grey	Chemistry	Kavli Medal and Lecture in 2011	
2011		Janet Hemingway	Tropical medicine		
2011		Fiona Powrie	Gastroenterology		
2011		Angela Vincent	Biology		
2012		Michele Dougherty	Astrophysics		
2012		Margaret Robinson	Molecular biology, cell biology		
2013		Judith Armitage	Biochemistry		
2013		Gillian Griffiths	Cell biology, immunology		
2013	Joanna Haigh	Joanna Haigh	Atmospheric physics		
2013	Edith Heard as she was receiving the CNRS gold medal on December 12, 2024	Edith Heard	Epigenetics		
2013		Anne Mills	Health economics		
2013		Maria Grazia Spillantini	Neurology		
2013		Brigitta Stockinger	Immunology		
2013	Sophie Wilson in 2009	Sophie Wilson	Computer architecture		
2013	Julia Yeomans in 2018	Julia Yeomans	Physics		
2014		Dorothy Bishop	Psychology		
2014	Sally Davies	Sally Davies	Medicine		
2014		Marian Dawkins	Zoology		
2014		Amanda Fisher	Biology		
2014		Jenny Nelson	Physics		
2014		Karalyn Patterson	Neuroscience		
2014		Sheena Radford	Biophysics		
2015		Jane Clarke	Biophysics		
2015		Anne Cutler	Psycholinguistics		
2015		Annette Dolphin	Pharmacology		
2015		Yvonne Elsworth	Helioseismology		
2015		Alison Etheridge	Probability		
2015		Jane A. Langdale	Plant development		
2015		Julia Slingo	Meteorology		
2015		Natalie Strynadka	Biochemistry		
2016		Polina Bayvel	Optical communication		
2016		Katharine Cashman	Volcanology		
2016		Sarah Cleaveland	Epidemiology		
2016		Christl Donnelly	Epidemiology		
2016		Maria Fitzgerald	Neuroscience		
2016		Pratibha Gai	Microscopy		
2016		Anne Glover	Biology		
2016		Sue Ion	Nuclear power		
2016		Eugenia Kumacheva	Chemistry		
2016		Corinne Le Quéré	Climate change		
2016		Eleanor Maguire	Neuroscience		
2016		Caroline Series	Mathematics		
2016		Alison Smith	Plant biochemistry		
2017		Wendy Bickmore	Genome biology		
2017		Anne Ferguson-Smith	Genetics		
2017		Gabriele C. Hegerl	Climate change		
2017		Yvonne Jones	Molecular biology		
2017		Julia King	Engineering		
2017		Anne Neville	Engineering		
2017		Alison Noble	Biomedical engineering		
2017		Josephine Pemberton	Evolutionary biology		
2017		Sarah (Sally) Price	Chemistry		
2017		Anne Ridley	Cell biology		
2017		Nicola Spaldin	Materials science		
2017		Jennifer Thomas	Physicist		
2017		Susanne von Caemmerer	Plant physiology		
2018		Polly Arnold	Chemistry		
2018		Jillian Banfield	Microbial ecology		
2018		Margaret Brimble	Chemistry		
2018		Judy Hirst	Mitochondrial biology		
2018		Cathie Martin	Plant biotechnology		
2018		Tracy Palmer	Microbiology		
2018		Lalita Ramakrishnan	Microbiology		
2018		Nancy Reid	Statistics		
2018		Sheila Rowan	Physics		
2018		Ingrid Scheffer	Neurology		
2018		Michele Simmons	Quantum physics		
2018		Angela Strank	Geology		
2019		Lucy Carpenter	Atmospheric chemistry		
2019		Sarah C. Darby	Epidemiology		
2019		Véronique Gouverneur	Chemistry		
2019		Gagandeep Kang	Microbiology		
2019	Marta Kwiatkowska	Marta Kwiatkowska	Artificial Intelligence		
2019		Christine Orengo	Computational biology		
2019		Anne Osbourn	Microbiology		
2019		Barbara Sherwood Lollar	Geology		
2019		Molly Shoichet	Biomedical engineering	Ontario's first chief scientist	
2019		Liz Sockett	Bacteriology		
2020		Marian Holness	Geology		
2020		Xin Lu	Biology, Cancer research		
2020		Catherine Price	Cognitive neuroscience		
2020		Carol Prives	Biology, Cancer research		
2020		Linda Nazar	Chemistry		
2020	Molly Stevens	Molly Stevens	Biomedical engineering		
2020	Donna Strickland	Donna Strickland	Physics	Awarded the Nobel Prize in Physics in 2018	
2020	Sarah Teichmann	Sarah Teichmann	Bioinformatics, Biophysics, Genomics, Immunology		
2020	Jane Visvader	Jane Visvader	Cell and Molecular Biology		
2021	Julie Ahringer	Julie Ahringer	Molecular genetics		
2021		Connie Eaves	Medical genetics		
2021		Sadaf Farooqi	Medicine, Genetics of obesity		
2021		Ten Feizi	Molecular biology		
2021	Julie Forman-Kay	Julie Forman-Kay	Biochemistry, Cell and molecular biology Molecular medicine		
2021	Jane Francis	Jane Francis	Paleoclimatology		
2021		Vernonica Franklin-Tong	Cell biology (Plant)		
2021		Usha Goswami	Cognitive neuroscience		
2021		Karen Heywood	Oceanography		
2021		Rebecca Kilner	Evolutionary biology		
2021		Fiona Marshall	Pharmacology		
2021		Frances Platt	Biochemistry, Pharmacology		
2021		Marilyn Renfree	Zoology		
2021		Abigail Sellen	HCI		
2021		Karen Vogtmann	Mathematics		
2021		Charlotte Williams	Chemistry		
2022		Eileen Furlong	Molecular biology		
2022		Jane Hillston	Computer science		
2022		Sandra Knapp	Botany		
2022		Susan M. Lea	Structural biology		
2022		Irene Miguel-Aliaga	Physiology		
2022		Rachel O'Reilly	Chemistry		
2022		Rosalind Rickaby	Biogeochemistry (Marine)		
2022		Yvonne Rogers	Cognitive science, HCI, IxD		
2022		Kate Storey	Developmental biology		
2022		Carola Garcia de Vinuesa	Immunology		
2022		E. Sally Ward	Immunology		
2022		Rachel Wood	Geology, Paleobiology		
2023		Judith Allen	Immunology		
2023		Sue Black	Anatomy; Forensic anthropology Forensic science		
2023		Cathie Clarke	Astrophysics		
2023		Wendy Freedman	Astronomy		
2023		Sarah Gilbert	Vaccinology	Awarded the Albert Medal in 2021, the Princess of Asturias Award in 2021 and the King Faisal Prize in 2023	
2023		Louise Heathwaite	Environmental science		
2023		Laura Heyderman	Physics, Materials science		
2023		Loeske Kruuk	Evolutionary biology		
2023		Jane Memmott	Ecology, Entomology		
2023		Valerie Mizrahi	Molecular biology		
2023		Tebello Nyokong	Chemistry		
2023		Sarah O'Connor	Molecular biology		
2023		Jane Parker	Botany		
2023		Lori Passmore	Structural biology CryoEM; RNA processing		
2023		Hanadi Sleiman	Chemistry		
2023		Elizabeth Thompson	Mathematical statistics Population genetics		
2023		Irene Tracey	Neuroscience, Pain, Neuroimaging		
2024		Frances Balkwill	Cell Biology		
2024		Heidi Johansen-Berg	Cognitive Neuroscience		
2024		Donna Blackmond	Organic Chemistry		
2024		Sarah-Jayne Blakemore	Cognitive Neuroscience		
2024		Helen Blau	Cell Biology		
2024	Jo Dunkley	Jo Dunkley	Cosmology		
2024		Rebecca Fitzgerald	Oncology		
2024		Anjali Goswami	Evolutionary Biology		
2024		Maria Harrison	Microbiology		
2024		Laura Herz	Physics	Awarded the Nevill Mott Medal and Prize in 2018 and the Faraday Medal and Prize in 2024	
2024		Saskia Hogenhout	Biochemistry		
2024		Daniela Kühn	Combinatorics		
2024		Barbara Maher	Environmental Science		
2024	Tamsin Mather	Tamsin Mather	Volcanology		
2024		Patricia Monaghan	Ecology		
2024		Sarah Otto	Evolutionary Biology		
2024		Lorraine Symington	Genetics		
2024		Mihaela van der Schaar	Computer Science		
2024		Sarah Tabrizi	Neuroscience		
2024		Xiaodong Zhang	Biochemistry		
2025		Quarraisha Abdool Karim	Epidemiology		
2025		Deborah Ashby	Statistics		
2025		Judith Driscoll	Nanoengineering		
2025		Marie Edmonds	Earth science		
2025		Sue Grimmond	Meteorology		
2025		Jane Hill	Entomologist		
2025		Barbara Imperiali	Organic chemistry		
2025		Cristina Lazzeroni	Particle physics		
2025		Melissa Little	Stem cell medicine		
2025		Wenbo Ma	Phytopathology		
2025		Jennifer McElwain	Botanist		
2025		Ravigadevi Sambanthamurthi	Oil palm biochemistry and genomics		
2025		Claire Spottiswoode	Evolutionary ecology		
2025		Swee Lay Thein	Molecular hematology		
2025		Reidun Twarock	Mathematical virology		
2025		Joanne Webster	Epidemiology		
2025		Marta Zlatic	Neuroscience		

== Foreign members ==
List of female Foreign Members
Year of election	Image	Member	Field(s)	Notes	Ref.
1955	Lise Meitner in 1946	Lise Meitner	Nuclear physics		
1969		Inge Lehmann	Seismology		
1989		Nicole Le Douarin	Developmental biology	Delivered the Claude Bernard Lecture in 1987	
1989	Barbara McClintock at work in her laboratory	Barbara McClintock	Cytogenetics	Awarded the Nobel Prize in Physiology or Medicine in 1983	
1990	Christiane Nusslein-Volhard in 2007	Christiane Nusslein-Volhard	Genetics, embryology	Awarded the Nobel Prize in Physiology or Medicine in 1995	
1995		Gertrude Elion	Biochemistry, pharmacology	Awarded the Nobel Prize in Physiology or Medicine in 1988	
1995		Salome Gluecksohn-Waelsch	Genetics		
1995	Rita Levi-Montalcini in 1986	Rita Levi-Montalcini	Neurology	Awarded the Nobel Prize in Physiology or Medicine in 1986	
2001		Clara Franzini-Armstrong	Developmental biology		
2004	Jane Lubchenco in 2009	Jane Lubchenco	Marine biology	Under Secretary of Commerce for Oceans and Atmosphere of the United States 2010–present	
2005		Catherine Cesarsky	Astronomy		
2008		Barbara Hohn	Molecular biology		
2008	Susan Solomon in 2004	Susan Solomon	Atmospheric chemistry		
2010	Pascale Cossart in 2011	Pascale Cossart	Bacteriology		
2011		Joanne Chory	Molecular biology, Cell biology		
2011		Carla Shatz	Neuroscience		
2012	Bonnie Bassler	Bonnie Bassler	Molecular biology		
2013		Margaret Buckingham	Developmental biology		
2014		Joan Steitz	Molecular biology		
2015		Linda Buck	Olfactory system	Awarded the Nobel Prize in Physiology or Medicine in 2004	
2015		Susan Lindquist	Molecular biology		
2015		Gail Martin	Developmental Biology		
2016		Jennifer Doudna	Biochemistry	Awarded the Nobel Prize in Chemistry in 2020	
2016		Ellen Williams	Nanotechnology		
2017		Marcia McNutt	Geophysics		
2017		Susan R. Wessler	Plant molecular biology		
2018		Carolyn R. Bertozzi	Systems biology	Awarded the Nobel Prize in Chemistry in 2022	
2018		Fabiola Gianotti	Particle physics		
2019		Sandra Diaz	Ecology		
2019		Elaine Fuchs	Cell biology		
2019		Inez Fung	Climatology		
2020		Frances Arnold	Bioengineering	Awarded the Nobel Prize in Chemistry in 2018	
2020		Else Marie Friis	Palaeobiology		
2020		Regine Kahmann	Microbiology		
2020		Margaret Kivelson	Geophysics		
2020		Ada Yonath	Microbiology	Awarded the Nobel Prize in Chemistry in 2009	
2021		Anny Cazenave	Earth sciences		
2021		Elena Conti	Biochemistry		
2021	Julie Forman-Kay	Julie Forman-Kay	Biochemistry		
2021		V. Narry Kim	Biochemistry		
2021		Claire Voisin	Mathematics		
2022		Titia de Lange	Biochemistry		
2022		Maria Leptin	Immunology		
2023		Eva-Mari Aro	Biology		
2023		Odile Eisenstein	Chemistry		
2023		Shafi Goldwasser	Artificial intelligence		
2023		May-Britt Moser	Neuroscience	Awarded the Nobel Prize in Physiology or Medicine in 2014	
2023		Karen Uhlenbeck	Mathematics	Awarded the Abel Prize in 2019	
2024		Emily Carter	Materials science		
2024		Emmanuelle Charpentier	Microbiology	Awarded the Nobel Prize in Chemistry in 2020	
2024		Ingrid Daubechies	Mathematics		
2024		Ruth Lehmann	Reproductive biology		
2024		Susana Magallón	Evolutionary biology		
2024		Kyoko Nozaki	Chemistry		
2024		Aviv Regev	Computational biology		
2024		Erin Schuman	Neuroscience		
2025		Asifa Akhtar	Genetics and cell biology		
2025		Yasmine Belkaid	Immunology		
2025		Antje Boetius	Marine biology		
2025		Claudia Felser	Chemistry and materials science		
2025		Ursula Keller	Physics		
2025		Eva Nogales	Biophysics		

== Honorary and Statute 12 fellows ==
Between 1903 and 1996, Statute 12 of the Society permitted the council to elect someone who would not otherwise qualify for election under the normal criteria for "conspicuous service to the cause of science, or are such that their election would be of signal benefit to the Society". Statute 12 Fellows were replaced by the introduction of Honorary Fellows in 1997.

List of female honorary and Statute 12 fellows
Year of election	Image	Fellow	Field(s)	Notes	Ref.
1983	Margaret Thatcher in mid-1990s	Margaret Thatcher	Politics	Prime Minister of the United Kingdom (1979–1990)	
1988	Margaret Gowing	Margaret Gowing	History of science	Delivered the Wilkins Lecture in 1976	
2007	Onora O'Neill in the House of Lords	Onora O'Neill	Philosophy, politics		
2015		Lisa Jardine	History		
2023		Kate Bingham			
2023		Fiona Fox			
2025		Baroness Manningham-Buller			

== Royal fellows and patrons ==
Throughout its history, the Royal Society has elected a number of individuals to its Fellowship by virtue of their being a member of the nobility. Such elections were restricted first in 1874 to princes and members of the Privy Council, and subsequently in 1903 to princes of the British Royal Family only. This has since been relaxed to allow the election of any member of the British Royal Family. Those elected by virtue of their royal blood or marriage are known as Royal Fellows. From the beginning of the practice of British royal patronage in the 18th century, the reigning monarch of Great Britain (and since 1801 that of the United Kingdom), starting with King George I, has always served as patron of the Society.

List of female Royal Fellows and Patrons
Year of election	Image	Fellow / Patron	Notes	Ref.
1838	Queen Victoria in 1882	Queen Victoria	Never elected as a Royal Fellow, instead served as Patron of the Society after her reign began as Queen of the United Kingdom and later Empress of India.	
1947	Queen Elizabeth II in 2007	Queen Elizabeth II	Queen of the United Kingdom and the other Commonwealth realms, and patron from 1952	
1956	Queen Elizabeth The Queen Mother in 1986	Queen Elizabeth The Queen Mother	Queen consort of King George VI	
1987	Anne, Princess Royal in 2007	Princess Anne	Princess Royal	

== See also ==
- List of Fellows of the Royal Society
- List of female scientists before the 21st century
