= List of fellows of the Royal Society elected in 2025 =

This article lists fellows of the Royal Society who were elected in 2025.

== Fellows ==
1. Quarraisha Abdool Karim
2. Neil Alford
3. Deborah Ashby
4. Bernard P. Binks
5. Philip Boyd
6. John Briggs
7. Morris Brown
8. Edward Bullmore
9. Matteo Carandini
10. Xiaodong Chen
11. Alessio Ciulli
12. Jonathan Clayden
13. Jonathan Coleman
14. Iain Couzin
15. Gabor Csanyi
16. Judith Driscoll
17. Marie Edmonds
18. Anthony Finkelstein
19. Kevin Foster
20. Mike Giles
21. Sue Grimmond
22. Jim Hall
23. Graham Hatfull
24. Julian Hibberd
25. Jane Hill
26. Neil Hunter
27. Barbara Imperiali
28. Chennupati Jagadish
29. Leo James
30. Gregory Jefferis
31. Sajeev John
32. John Jumper
33. Baljit Khakh
34. John King
35. Philipp Kukura
36. William Laurance
37. Cristina Lazzeroni
38. Mark Lewis
39. Melissa H. Little
40. Wenbo Ma
41. Graham Machin
42. Jennifer McElwain
43. Jason Miller
44. Charles Mullighan
45. Donal O'Carroll
46. Prakash Panangaden
47. Andrew Pitts
48. Philip Poole
49. Hugh Possingham
50. David Pyle
51. Graham Reed
52. Daniel Rueckert
53. Stuart Russell
54. Ravigadevi Sambanthamurthi
55. Andrew Singleton
56. Nigel Smith
57. Shivaji Sondhi
58. Claire Spottiswoode
59. Nial Tanvir
60. Mallikarjun Tatipamula
61. Swee Lay Thein
62. Arkady Tseytlin
63. Miltos Tsiantis
64. Jacob Tsimerman
65. Reidun Twarock
66. Joanne P. Webster
67. Tien Y. Wong
68. Tony Wood
69. Dek Woolfson
70. Marta Zlatic

== Honorary Fellows ==
1. Baroness Manningham-Buller

== Foreign Members ==
1. Asifa Akhtar
2. Yasmine Belkaid
3. Robert E. Black
4. Antje Boetius
5. Zhijian 'James' Chen
6. Robbert Dijkgraaf
7. Claudia Felser
8. Bin Han
9. Mohamed Hassan
10. Sanwen Huang
11. Claude Jaupart
12. Ursula Keller
13. Ulman Lindenberger
14. Detlef Lohse
15. Eiichi Nakamura
16. Eva Nogales
17. Stephen Pacala
18. Judea Pearl
19. Steve Quake
20. John Rogers
21. Joshua Sanes
22. Terrence Sejnowski
23. Yifang Wang
24. Xueming Yang
