= List of fellows of the Royal Society elected in 2023 =

List of Fellows of the Royal Society

This article lists fellows of the Royal Society who were elected in 2023.

== Fellows ==
1. Bashir Al-Hashimi
2. Judith Allen
3. Myles Allen
4. Sue Black
5. Bradley Cairns
6. Keith Caldecott
7. Ian Chapman
8. Bryan Charleston
9. Sourav Chatterjee
10. Cathie Clarke
11. Pieter Cullis
12. Andrew Davison
13. Michael Depledge
14. W. Ford Doolittle
15. Michael Dustin
16. Wendy Freedman
17. Huajian Gao
18. Julian William Gardner
19. Sarah Gilbert
20. Andrey Golutvin
21. Andrew Goodwin
22. Louise Heathwaite
23. Laura Heyderman
24. Andrew Hopkins
25. John Hutchinson
26. Michael Isard
27. Christopher Jiggins
28. David Jones
29. Philip Jones
30. Loeske Kruuk
31. Mark Lancaster
32. Ben Lehner
33. Simon L Lewis
34. Allan Matthews
35. James Maynard
36. Jane Memmott
37. R. J. Dwayne Miller
38. Valerie Mizrahi
39. Graeme Moad
40. Madan Babu Mohan
41. Robert Mokaya
42. Tebello Nyokong
43. Sarah O'Connor
44. Jane Parker
45. Lori Passmore
46. Graham Pearson
47. Peter Sewell
48. Hanadi Sleiman
49. Ivan Smith
50. Matthew Stephens
51. William Sutherland
52. Elizabeth A. Thompson
53. Irene Tracey
54. James Turner
55. Derek Vance
56. Rajeev Varshney
57. Scott Waddell
58. Philip Wadler
59. Christopher Whitty

== Honorary Fellows ==
1. Kate Bingham
2. Fiona Fox

== Foreign Members ==
1. Eva-Mari Aro
2. Jeffery Dangl
3. Stanislas Dehaene
4. Odile Eisenstein
5. Shafi Goldwasser
6. Douglas Hanahan
7. Gerald Haug
8. Kristian Helin
9. Kei Hirose
10. Yonggang Huang
11. Susumu Kitagawa
12. Jinghai Li
13. Edvard Moser
14. May-Britt Moser
15. Subir Sachdev
16. Yoshinori Tokura
17. Karen Uhlenbeck
18. Ronald Vale
19. Moshe Vardi
