= Jane Hill (disambiguation) =

Jane Hill (born 1969) is a British newsreader.

Jane Hill may also refer to:

- Jane Hill (ecologist), British-born academic
- Jane Hill (politician) (1936–2015), Australian politician
- Jane H. Hill (1939–2018), American anthropologist and linguist

== See also ==
- Hill (surname)
- Hill (disambiguation)
