= Hugh Hamshaw Thomas =

British paleobotanist

Hugh Hamshaw Thomas MBE FRS
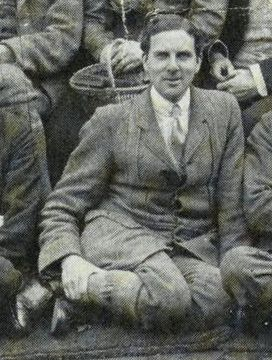
- Hugh Hamshaw Thomas, 1913
- Born: 29 May 1885; Wrexham
- Died: 30 June 1962 (aged 77); Cambridge
- Education: Downing College, Cambridge
- Awards: Darwin-Wallace Medal (Silver, 1958); Linnean Medal (1960); Fellow of the Royal Society
- Scientific career
- Fields: Paleobotany
- Author abbrev. (botany): H.H.Thomas

Hugh Hamshaw "Ham" Thomas FRS (29 May 1885 – 30 June 1962), was a British paleobotanist. One of his major contributions was to combine thinking about plant fossil anatomy with ecology, and consideration of how these related to non-extinct plants. He also led a change in attitude to fossils, from museum-based to a more exploratory, field-work based subject.

== Education ==
Thomas was born in Wrexham the son of Elizabeth Lloyd, from a farming family, and her husband William Thomas, who ran a men's outfitter's business. He had an elder brother and sister. After initially attending a private school he was educated at Grove Park School, Wrexham where he was finally head boy. He had already started an interest in fossils, collected from local coal mines. As well as prizes from the school, he was awarded a gold medal from the national Central Welsh Board.

With the support of an entrance scholarship he started at Downing College, Cambridge in 1904, choosing Cambridge because his sister had studied there. Thomas studied botany, physics and chemistry in his first two years and history in his third. He came to know Albert Seward, professor of botany, especially paleobotany, and his family from their mutual interest in fossil plants. He was president of the college hockey club all his life. Thomas took the Civil Service examination and was offered a post but decided to continue in academia.

== Career ==
With irregular financial support over the next few years, he was attached to the (now) Sedgwick Museum of Earth Sciences but undertook collecting and research on plant fossils, particularly in coal balls and began to publish papers about his work and ideas, supported by Edward Alexander Newell Arber, demonstrator in paleobotany at the museum. He began to think about the environment in which the plants had grown. He became a university lecturer in botany and a fellowship at Downing college in 1914 made him financially secure. He was curator of the museum in the Botany Department from 1909 to 1923, lecturer from 1923 to 1937, and reader in plant morphology from 1937 to 1950.

Thomas came under Seward's influence again and focused on the Jurassic flora. He also developed the habit, influenced by Robert Kidston, of not publishing his work until he had a sufficient body of material to be absolutely certain of his conclusions. The result was that he did not publish some of his work and ideas for decades, or not at all. His visit to Stockholm in 1911 was an important point in his career. He met the Swedish geologist Alfred Gabriel Nathorst, and became aware of methods to extract plant cuticles from fossils. He worked briefly on cuticles from British coal measures with a student, Lucy Wills, but ended this work when she changed to pursue a career in medicine. He also worked with Nellie Bancroft, to show that the cuticle cell structure clearly divided fossil cycad-like leaves into two group, one like modern cycads and the other like the extinct plant group Bennettitales.

However, he had also met another Swedish paleobotanist, Thore Halle (1884–1964), whose experience of plant fossils from the coast of Yorkshire inspired Thomas to seek out new fossils from these locations. He searched for the inconspicuous specimens of fruit or flowers, rather than the larger, more obvious, leaves. This enabled him to demonstrate that the seed-bearing Caytonia, the pollen-bearing Antholithius and the leaves Sagenopteris were all parts of the same plant. It was in the Caytoniales, important to gymnosperm evolution. Thomas's approach to paleobotany, of actively seeking out his own specimens (rather than relying on ones sent to the museum), was novel to UK paleobotany at the time, and had a longer-term impact on the field than his scientific discoveries alone.

Thomas's experience with aerial photography and mapping during the First World War led to him being involved in a project on mapping India from aerial photographs as well as research in the Aeronautical Department at Cambridge on his return to civilian life after the war.

He was awarded the university's Walsingham medal in 1923 and a D. Sc. degree in 1926. He was elected a Fellow of the Royal Society in May, 1934. His candidature citation read: "His researches cover a wide field; to Palaeobotany he has made several original contributions of great value; notably on the leaves of Calamites (Phil Tran, 1911), on the structure of Cycadean fronds, on new genera, e.g., Williamsoniella (Phil Trans, 1915); the Caytoniales, a paper of exceptional importance (Phil Trans, 1925); also several papers on Jurassic floras, etc. Dr Thomas is well known as an authority on aircraft photography and was one of the first to demonstrate its application to the survey of vegetation. His work is characterized by originality and by the skilful use of new methods of technique."

After being elected a Fellow in 1925, he was president of the Linnean Society of London from 1955 to 1958 and was awarded their prestigious Darwin-Wallace Medal in 1958 and their Linnean Medal in 1960. Thomas was also a founding member of the British Society for the History of Science, later serving as the Society's President between 1953 and 1955.

== War service ==
Thomas joined the Office Training Corps as World War I started and by 1915 was with the Royal Artillery in France. He was transferred to the defence of the Suez Canal in 1916 and to the Royal Flying Corps. He served as a Photographic Officer in Europe and the Middle East. With the rank of captain, he led a team that was the first to draw maps from aerial photographs, that assisted the British ground campaigns in the region. He was awarded the Order of the Nile by Egypt and a military MBE by Britain as well as being mentioned in dispatches two times.

During the Second World War, he was a photographic interpreter at RAF Medmenham with the rank of Wing Commander, where he worked on the interpretation of aerial reconnaissance photographs. Whilst being shown around the PI centre at Medmenham, after being at a meeting including Hamshaw Thomas, afterwards, out of earshot, South African Prime Minister Jan Smuts turned to his companion and said; "Do you know, that fellow" - (referring to Hamshaw Thomas) - "is the world's leading palaeobotanist" - Smuts was a renowned botanist himself. As "Chief of Third Phase Interpretation", in 1943 it was Hamshaw Thomas who was responsible, along with his Army opposite number, Norman Falcon, for initiating the Allied investigation of the German research centre at Peenemünde

He died in Cambridge in 1962.
