= Rutherford Medal =

Rutherford Medal may refer to:

- Rutherford Medal (Royal Society of New Zealand) of the Royal Society of New Zealand
- Rutherford Memorial Medal of the Royal Society of Canada
- Rutherford Medal and Prize of the Institute of Physics, UK
- Rutherford Memorial Lecture (Royal Society) of the Royal Society
