= Southend High School =

Southend High School may refer to:

- Southend High School for Boys
- Southend High School for Girls
