= List of fellows of the Royal Society =

More than 8,000 people have been elected a fellow of the Royal Society of London, England, since the inception of the Royal Society in 1660. The Royal Society publishes a database of current fellows and a database of past fellows.

== Alphabetic lists ==
Complete list of fellows of the Royal Society
A, B, C	D, E, F	G, H, I	J, K, L	M, N, O	P, Q, R	S, T, U, V	W, X, Y, Z

== See also ==
- List of female Fellows of the Royal Society
- Category:Fellows of the Royal Society (alphabetical)
- Category:Lists of fellows of the Royal Society by year
