= Southend High School for Girls =

Coordinates: 51.5415°N 0.7459°E

- SHSG School crest

Location
- Southchurch Boulevard; Southend-on-Sea, Essex, SS2 4UZ; England

Information
- Type: Grammar school Academy
- Motto: Latin: Ad Dei Gloriam (Glory to God)
- Established: 1913
- Local authority: Southend-on-Sea
- Department for Education URN: 136444 Tables
- Ofsted: Reports
- Chair of Governors: Lianne Lambert
- Headteacher: Jason Carey
- Gender: Girls
- Age: 11 to 18
- Houses: Artemis; Hermes; Hera; Athene; Aphrodite; Aurora
- Colours: Green and white
- Website: http://www.shsg.org/

Southend High School for Girls is a grammar school with academy status situated on Southchurch Boulevard in the east of Southend-on-Sea, Essex, England. It caters for students from the age of 11 through to 18 years old.

== Establishment ==
The Technical Instruction Act 1889 and Technical Instruction Act 1891 allowed councils to provide evening classes for technical subjects. The local board set up the Technical Instruction Committee, and soon classes were started. They were extremely popular, and the following year the newly created Southend Corporation purchased land in Clarence Road to build a technical institute. In 1895 the foundation stone was laid, but prior to it opening it was decided to also open a day technical school for about 20 pupils, influenced by the Bryce commission of 1894. The first headmaster was J. Hitchcock from Woolwich and was supported by one assistant teacher.

The new building however was quickly outgrown, with 72 pupils by 1896 and to 146 by 1901, mirroring the growth of the town. The Technical Instruction Committee urged the council to build a new school in 1896, with pupil numbers expected to grow to 400 by 1907. Unfortunately the vote by the council was 10 for and 10 against. However, plans were developed to build a new school, library and town hall on land owned by the council at Victoria Circus. A design by H. T. Hare was chosen, with an estimated price of £16,350, with a grant of £5,000 provided by Essex County Council towards the cost. However by 1900, these plans fell apart and the library and town hall were dropped from the plans as estimated costs had risen to £27,000. In 1901, the foundation stone was laid by Lord Avebury, and a year later the joint Technical Institute and Day Technical School was opened by the Countess of Warwick. The day technical school was a pioneer in the country in that amongst its pupils were girls.

By 1905, an extension was added to cope with the demand of both the day technical school and the college of art which was located in the top floor. In 1907, Essex County Council formed a new Higher Education Committee, who decided that education should be split into separate boys and girls schools. In 1912, a foundation stone was laid in Boston Avenue for a new girls school, and a year later the girls left the Day Technical School to the newly named Southend High School for Girls. The Day Technical School was renamed as Southend High School for Boys.

== Academics ==
As of 2025, the school's most recent Ofsted inspection was in 2024, when it was judged Outstanding.

The school has a specialism in languages. All Key Stage 3 students study French and German or French and Spanish (replacing Latin in 2002, which is now available as an additional subject studied off-timetable).

The school also offers other additional languages to the students, for example Chinese, Russian or Polish, but these come at a personal expense to the student themselves.

The school achieves excellent results at A level and other examinations, consistently above national averages, in part because of the selective entry system.

In Science, Mathematics, English and Geography all students take a two-year Key Stage 3 qualification allowing them to start their GCSE studies early.

== Demographics ==
According to the school's most recent Ofsted report:

"Most students are from a White British heritage, and a broadly average proportion is from minority ethnic backgrounds. No students are in the early stages of learning English. The proportion of students with special educational needs and/or disabilities is low and the proportion known to be entitled to free school meals is below average."

== Notable former pupils ==
- Prof Lorna Casselton, Professor of Fungal Genetics at the University of Oxford and expert in the sexual behaviour of mushrooms from 1997 to 2003
- Prof Deborah Ashby, Professor of Medical Statistics and Clinical Trials at Imperial College London and expert on Bayesian statistics
- Brigadier Jill Field CBE, Matron-in-Chief of the Army and Director of Defence Nursing Services from 1989 to 1992
- Jo Richardson, Labour MP for Barking from 1974 to 1994
- Sarah Wilhelmy, Former Great Britain international Athlete and representative at the 2000 Summer Olympics
- Ruby Tandoh, runner-up on series four of BBC's The Great British Bake Off in 2013
- Rachel Riley, co-host of Countdown from 2009.
- Michelle Agyemang, Footballer for Arsenal Women’s team

== Arson ==
In April 2003 the school was closed for two days following a fire in an art room started by a student. On the day of the re-opening another fire was started; eventually three students were arrested in connection with the incidents. There was also another fire started in Room 8 on the middle floor of the towerblock. The second fire was started in close proximity to gas pipes. In total three fires were started in the space of a single month leading to several parents withdrawing their daughters from the school.

The school was again attacked in December 2005 causing several thousand pounds worth of damage to the school kitchen and a number of classrooms at the front of the school. The damage was so extensive that the Christmas holiday break was extended for students of years 7 and 8. Reconstruction work took almost a year whilst a new kitchen, dining room and reception area were constructed and a number of classrooms had to be fully refitted.
