= Cuticle analysis =

Archaeobotanical method to reconstruct past environments

The microscopic structure of a leaf, showing the position of the cuticle in relation to the epidermis and other key features.

Cuticle analysis, also known as fossil cuticle analysis and cuticular analysis, is an archaeobotanical method that uses plant cuticles to reconstruct the vegetation of past grassy environments. Cuticles comprise the protective layer of the skin, or epidermis, of leaves and blades of grass. They are made of cutin, a resilient substance that can preserve the shapes of underlying cells, a quality that aids in the identification of plants that are otherwise no longer visible in the archaeological record. This can inform archaeobotanists on the floral makeup of a past environment, even when surviving remains from the plants are limited. Plant cuticles have also been incorporated into other areas of archaeobotanical research based on their susceptibility to environmental factors such as pCO_{2} levels and stresses such as water deficit and sodium chloride exposure. Such research can help to reconstruct past environments and identify ecological events.

== Method ==
There is no one universal method to cuticle analysis. Rather, it is the shared principle on which the applications are based which underpins the methodology—namely, that a well-preserved plant cuticle can, through the use of microscopy, yield information regarding the nature of the plant from which it originated, including its species and the environmental stresses acting upon it. Depending on the desired outcome, both scanning electron microscopy (SEM) and transmission electron microscopy (TEM) can be used, the main difference being that while SEM can provide information regarding the outer characteristics of an organism, TEM can be used to show details of the inner structure. In SEM approaches, latex or silicone casts may be used to recreate epidermal and cuticular features in imperfectly preserved samples. Atomic force microscopy (AFM) can also be used as a complementary method to provide high-resolution topographic imaging at submicron scale. If the desired outcome is identification of the plant, the image created by one or a combination of these microscopy methods can then be compared to existing data, regarding both the impressions left in the cuticle of the underlying cell structure and the properties of the cuticle itself.

=== Cuticle extraction methods ===
Depending on preservation conditions, a method of extraction for the fossil cuticle is required before the analysis can take place. One such method for separating cuticles from a rock matrix is acid maceration, which involves soaking the sample in agents such as dilute hydrogen peroxide or hydrochloric and hydrofluoric acid (known as the HCI/HF protocol) to break down the matrix. However, this process is destructive and, if possible, avoided. Cuticle transfer techniques are generally preferred, as these methods preserve the physiognomy and morphology of the sample, regardless of how fragmented the specimen may be. Among the most practical and effective of these techniques is the polyester overlay transposition method, developed by Kouwenberg et al., which is both straightforward and non-destructive: the cuticle, either already accessible on the adaxial surface or exposed using cellophane tape from the abaxial surface, is pressed against the adhesive side of the polyester overlay and removed.

== Applications ==
The most straightforward application of fossil cuticle analysis is in the identification of the plants which comprised a past environment. This is because the cutin layer preserves some of the defining characteristics of the plant's underlying cell structure, allowing it to be identified by experts at a microscopic level. Taxonomical differences in the epidermises of the two species Pinus sylvestris L. and Pinus uncinata Ramond ex DC., for example, can often be observed from cuticle analysis, meaning the plants can still be reliably identified and distinguished from one another in cases where other methods such as pollen analysis are not possible. In broader studies of past flora, this method can be expanded to not only inform researchers of the plant species present but also of patterns and trends underlying this distribution. In 2003, for example, cuticle analysis was used in a multi-proxy study to reconstruct changes in vegetation during the Late Pleistocene and Holocene in Kenya, with particular regard to the proportion of plants following the C_{4} photosynthetic pathway, and more specifically the NADP-ME C_{4} sub-pathway. There are, however, a number of other ways that such data can be used, including the following:

=== In the reconstruction of past atmospheres ===
The relationship between past CO_{2} levels and fossil cuticles has, particularly in the last few decades, become an important source of information on historic atmospheric change. It has long been observed that the stomatal index of a leaf bears a direct, inverse correlation to the quantity of atmospheric CO_{2} at the time of growth. Because of the properties of the cuticle, this means that fossil cuticles are often the best-preserved source of information on the stomatal qualities of a plant, including its stomatal index, stomatal ratio, and stomatal density. The thickness of the cuticle can also indicate the properties of the atmosphere in which the plant grew.

The continuous record of atmospheric CO_{2} levels produced by Gregory Retallack used fossil plant cuticles in the above manner to produce an account of CO_{2} levels for the past 300 million years. Though met with some methodological critique, and limited in overall accuracy by the preservation bias, the study demonstrates the merits of using stomatal indices via fossil cuticles as a paleobarometer for past CO_{2} levels in the pursuit of the reconstruction of past atmospheres.

=== In the study of environmental stresses ===
Environmental stresses such as drought, volcanic gas exposure, and climatic factors can sometimes be observed through the cuticle of a leaf or grass blade. The presence of charred grass cuticles in African sediments, for example, demonstrates a pattern of grass fires still common in modern African savannahs. The cuticles thus preserved can in turn be used in research regarding the nature of plants in a region as well as the biomes to which they belong in relation to the broader environmental factors by which they are influenced.

In the case of volcanic sulphur dioxide (SO_{2}) emissions, fossil cuticle analysis has of late been considered as a potential proxy of unique merits. In a 2018 study, a strong correlation was found between significant SO_{2} exposure during the Triassic–Jurassic transition and damage to the cuticles of nearby plants. Given that there is prior research indicating that such exposure can result in distinct morphological changes to leaves and their cuticles, the main conclusion drawn was that volcanic activity and ensuing SO_{2} exposure played a significant part in the broader ecosystem response to the environmental challenges of the epoch.

=== In the study of paleoaltimetry ===
In 2004, Jennifer McElwain proposed a method for calculating paleoaltimetry using fossil cuticles and their record of stomatal density as a proxy for CO_{2} partial pressure (pCO_{2}). This technique utilises the inverse correlation between stomatal density and pCO_{2} to calculate paleo-elevation to within an average error range of ±300m, compared to ±400m in the comparable basaltic lava method. The technique is not universally applicable, however, as there are many types of plants that are not CO_{2} sensitive and are thus incompatible with the pCO_{2} paleoaltimeter.

=== In conjunction with geochemical fingerprinting ===
Geochemical fingerprinting is a technique that can incorporate data from both fossil and extant cuticles to better understand paleoenvironmental conditions and changes in relation to individual plant species. Defined by Jochen Hoefs as "a chemical signal that provides information about the origin, the formation and/or the environment of a geological sample", a geochemical fingerprint is a type of identification marker most remarkable because it will not typically change with time or age. In the context of cuticle analysis, this means that a plant's original chemical signature can be observed from a fossil cuticle sample. This can help to, among other things, establish correlative relationships between changes in historic plant geochemistry and events such as the end-Triassic extinction.

== Issues ==
One of the drawbacks of fossil cuticle analysis is the range of chemical changes inherent to the natural preservation of plant cuticles. A comparative study of both modern and ancient Ginkgo cuticles, for example, revealed a number of distinct, consistent diagenetic changes that altered the features of the samples over time. Ultimately, this means that, while incredibly informative, fossil cuticles cannot alone be used to reliably reconstruct features of past plants without consulting other sources of data, such as other contemporaneous plant matter or the modern descendants of either the species or its genus.
