= Graham Machin =

British physicist

Graham Machin FRS FREng
- Alma mater: University of Oxford
- Known for: Temperature metrology; redefinition of the kelvin
- Awards: Callendar Medal (2012); Sir Harold Hartley Medal (2021)
- Scientific career
- Fields: Metrology, thermometry
- Workplaces: National Physical Laboratory; University of Birmingham; University of Glasgow; University of Strathclyde
- Thesis: Variables in Globular Clusters and Low Mass X-Ray Binaries (1990)
- Doctoral advisor: Ian McHardy

Graham Machin is a physicist and specialist in thermometry, the science of temperature measurement. He is a senior fellow at the UK's National Physical Laboratory (NPL) and holds honorary professorships at the University of Birmingham and University of Glasgow, and a visiting professorship at the University of Strathclyde. He was elected a Fellow of the Royal Academy of Engineering in 2019 and a Fellow of the Royal Society in 2025.

== Education and career ==
Machin studied physics with astrophysics at the University of Birmingham, graduating with a Bachelor of Science (Honours) degree. He subsequently completed a DPhil at the University of Oxford in 1990, researching cataclysmic variables in globular clusters and low-mass X-ray binaries. He joined NPL in 1991, where his research has focused on temperature standards, measurement techniques and their industrial and scientific applications.

Machin has contributed to the implementation of the 2019 redefinition of the kelvin and the development of high-temperature fixed points used in thermometer calibration. His research also includes self-validating temperature sensors, non-contact thermometry and photonic and quantum-based temperature measurement. Applications of this work include aerospace engineering, nuclear decommissioning and healthcare.

He chaired the EURAMET Technical Committee for Thermometry from 2014 to 2018 and served as president of the Institute of Measurement and Control from 2018 to 2019. He also represents the United Kingdom on the International Committee for Weights and Measures Consultative Committee for Thermometry.

== Honours and awards ==
Machin received the Institute of Measurement and Control's Callendar Medal in 2012 for contributions to temperature measurement and the Sir Harold Hartley Medal in 2021 for contributions to measurement and control. He received a Doctor of Science degree from the University of Birmingham in 2015 and was elected an honorary fellow of the Institute of Measurement and Control in 2024. He was elected to the Royal Academy of Engineering in 2019 and the Royal Society in May 2025 in recognition of his contributions to temperature metrology.
