= Wenbo Ma =

Plant pathologist

Wenbo Ma FRS
- Education: Beijing Normal University (BSc); University of Waterloo (PhD)
- Awards: Ruth F. Allen Award (2021); Fellow of the American Association for the Advancement of Science (2022); Fellow of the Royal Society (2025)
- Scientific career
- Fields: Plant pathogens
- Workplaces: University of California, Riverside; Sainsbury Laboratory, Norwich, United Kingdom

Wenbo Ma FRS is a plant pathologist, who studies pathogens that cause a range of diseases in plants, including potato blight and Citrus greening disease. Ma was awarded the Ruth F. Allen award of the American Phytopathological Society in 2021; and was elected Fellow of the American Association for the Advancement of Science in 2022 and of the Royal Society in 2025.

== Education and career ==
Ma was an undergraduate student at Beijing Normal University, where she began training to be a biology teacher. She took up a research opportunity at the Chinese Academy of Sciences, with Professor Huarong Tan, and this inspired her to continue into research. Ma completed a PhD at the University of Waterloo, Ontario, Canada with Bernard Glick, and post-doctoral research at the University of Toronto, with David Guttman. She then took up a faculty position at University of California, Riverside in 2006. In 2020, Ma moved to Norwich, United Kingdom, to continue her work into plant disease as a senior group leader at the Sainsbury Laboratory.

== Research and awards ==
Ma's work focuses on the effector proteins, which cause infections in plant tissues. These pathogens can cause significant damage to crops, with severe social and economic consequences, including crop failure and famine. In 2013, Ma published research on the pathogen Phytophthora, which causes potato blight. She found that this pathogen suppresses the processes that are critical to plant growth development, and makes the plants more vulnerable to disease. In 2018, Ma and colleagues found a mechanism to explain how Candidatus Liberibacter bacteria causes citrus greening, by secreting an effector protein called SDE1 which breaks down the plant's defences. There is currently no cure for citrus greening disease, which has already had a major impact on citrus orchards in Florida.

In recognition of her work, Ma received the Ruth F. Allen Award from the American Phytopathological Society in 2021. She is an elected fellow of AAAS (in 2022) and the Royal Society (2025) and was elected a member of the European Molecular Biology Organization (EMBO) in 2024.
