= Ruth F. Allen =

American botanist and plant pathologist

- Born: 1879
- Died: 1963 (aged 83–84)
- Education: University of Wisconsin, A.B., 1905 University of Wisconsin, A.M., 1907 University of Wisconsin, PhD, 1909
- Occupation: Plant pathologist
- Employer(s): University of Wisconsin, Michigan State College, Wellesley College, US Department of Agriculture, University of California, Berkeley

Ruth Florence Allen (1879–1963) was an American botanist and plant pathologist and the first woman to earn her Ph.D. in botany from the University of Wisconsin. Her doctorate research focused on the reproduction and cell biology of ferns, particularly the phenomenon of apogamy (formation of an embryo without fertilization) (Allen, 1914). Later in her career, Allen shifted her focus to plant pathology. Her major contribution to the field of mycology was furthering the understanding of rust fungi, a group of economically important plant pathogens. Allen completed many studies on Puccinia graminis, once considered a catastrophically damaging disease-causing agent in cereal crops before the discovery of current management measures (Schumann and Leonard, 2000).

== Education and career ==
Ruth F. Allen received her Ph.D. in botany from the University of Wisconsin in 1909, with her thesis titled “Studies in spermatogenesis and apogamy in ferns”. After graduating, Allen worked as a botanist for the Michigan College and Station United States Department of Agriculture (USDA) (True, 1914). In 1916, Ruth F. Allen became an Assistant Professor of Botany at Wellesley College, a prominent women's liberal arts college in Wellesley, Massachusetts (Wellesley College, 1917). She later moved to California, where she worked at the University of California at Berkeley and the Bureau of Plant Industry, USDA and California Agricultural Experiment Station.

== Contribution to mycology ==
Allen's major contribution to the study of fungi is through the field of plant pathology. Her work on the cytology of the rust fungus Puccinia graminis helped to elucidate the life cycle and pathology of this devastating fungal disease agent of cereal crops. This species has several formae speciales, variations that utilize specific host plants but have identical morphology (Schumann and Leonard, 2000). The life cycle of Puccinia graminis f. sp. tritici, commonly called stem rust of wheat, is notoriously complex, with five types of spores (macrocyclic) and two distinct host plants (heteroecious).

This fungus is an obligate biotrophic (feeding on the living plant tissue) pathogen of cereal crops that can cause extensive yield loss (Schumann and Leonard, 2000). Until the advent of resistant cultivars, stem rust of wheat was considered a devastating pathogen capable of re-infecting plants in the same field over time and reaching epidemic levels. Allen's research on stem rust of wheat pathology on specific cultivars contributed to the understanding of how to control this cereal pathogen.

== Legacy ==
Allen's surviving heirs, Sam Emsweller, Mable Nebel, Hally Sax, and Evangeline Yarwood, created the Ruth Allen Memorial Fund through the American Phytopathological Society (APS) in 1965. Each year since, a certificate and monetary prize are awarded to an individual who makes an “outstanding, innovative research contribution that has changed, or has the potential to change, the direction of research in any field of plant pathology.”

== Important publications ==
- Allen, RF. 1914. Studies in spermatogenesis and apogamy in ferns. Transactions of the Wisconsin Academy of Sciences, Arts, and Letters 17 (1): 1-56.
- Allen, RF and HDM Jolivette. 1914. A study of the light reactions of Pilobolus. Transactions of the Wisconsin Academy of Sciences, Arts, and Letters 17 (1): 533–598.
- Allen, RF. 1923a. A cytological study of infection of Baart and Kanred wheats by Puccinia graminis tritici. Journal of Agricultural Research 23: 131–152.
- Allen, RF. 1923b. Cytological studies of infection of Baart, Kanred, and Mindum wheats by Puccinia graminis tritici form III and XIX. Journal of Agricultural Research 26: 571–604.
- Allen, RF. 1926. Cytological studies of forms 9, 21, and 27 of Puccinia graminis tritici on Khapli emmer. Contribution from Bureau of Plant Industry, 725 pp.
- Allen, RF. 1927. A cytological study of orange leaf rust, Puccinia triticina physiologic form 11, on Malakoff wheat. Journal of Agricultural Research 34: 697–714.
- Allen, RF. 1928. A cytological study of Puccinia glumarum on Bromus marginatus and Triticum vulgare. Journal of Agricultural Research 36: 487–513.
- Allen, RF. 1931. Heterothallism in Puccinia triticina. Science 74: 462–463.

== See also ==
- List of mycologists
