= Lorna Casselton =

British geneticist, academic and educator

Lorna Casselton CBE FRS
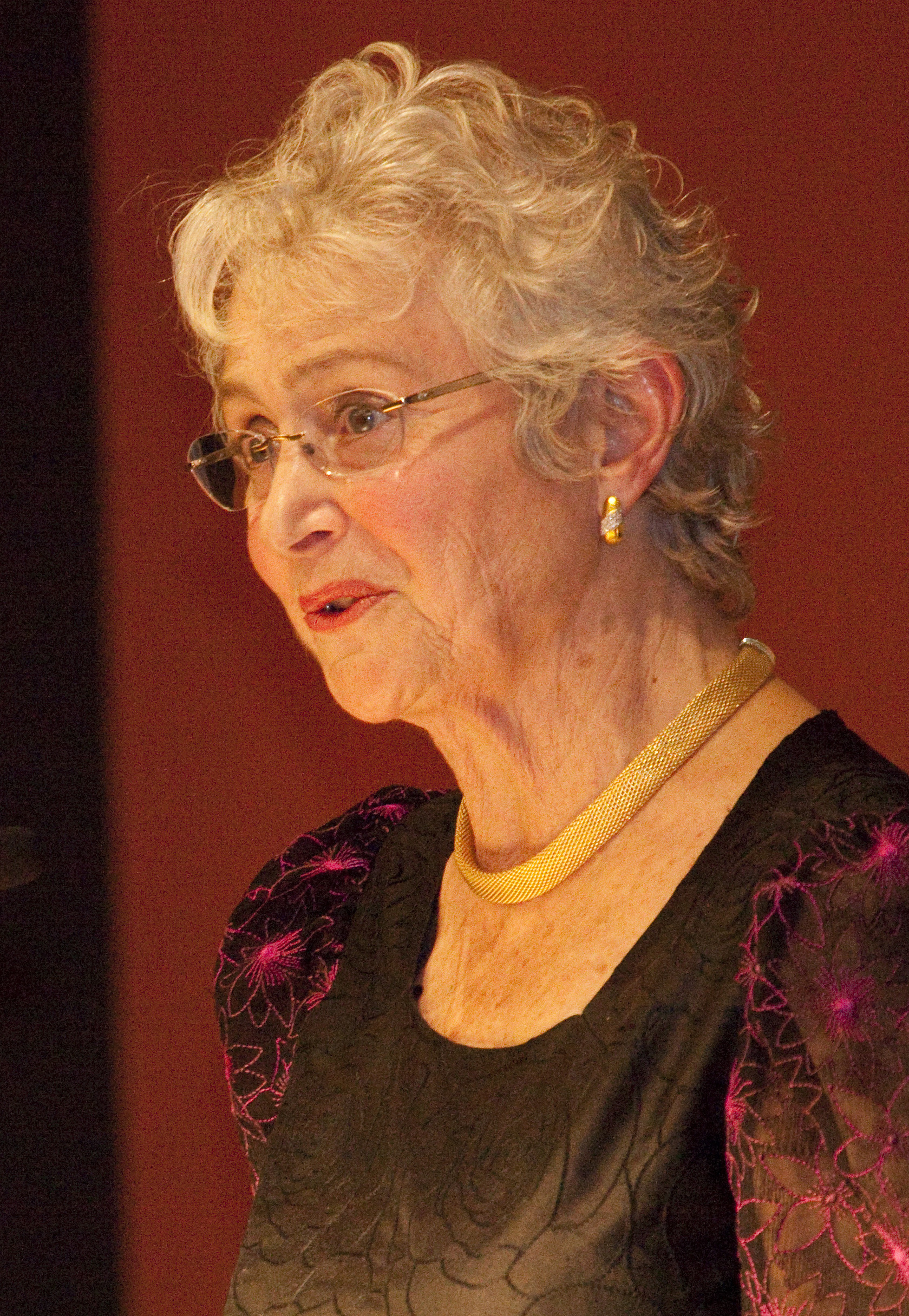
- Casselton in 2010.
- Born: Lorna Ann Smith; 18 July 1938; Rochford, Essex, England
- Died: 14 February 2014 (aged 75); Oxford, England
- Education: University College London
- Known for: Genetic and molecular analysis of mushrooms
- Spouses: Peter John Casselton (d. 1978); William Joseph Dennis Tollett (m. 1981)
- Awards: CBE (2012); MAE (2008); FRS (1999)
- Scientific career
- Workplaces: University of Oxford; Queen Mary University of London
- Thesis: The production, behaviour and genetics of diploids of Coprinus lagopus (1964)
- Doctoral advisor: Dan Lewis
- Website: royalsociety.org/people/lorna-casselton

Lorna Ann Casselton, CBE FRS (18 July 1938 – 14 February 2014) was a British academic and biologist. She was Professor Emeritus of Fungal Genetics in the Department of Plant Science at the University of Oxford, and was known for her genetic and molecular analysis of the mushroom Coprinus cinereus and Coprinus lagopus.

== Early life ==
Casselton was born on 18 July 1938 in Rochford, Essex to William Charles Henry Smith and Cecile Smith (née Bowman). Her parents' smallholding and her father's interest in natural history and genetics encouraged her and her sister Pauline in the direction of biology. She was educated at Southend High School for Girls, a grammar school in Southend-on-Sea. She studied at University College London, from which she gained a Bachelor of Science (BSc) degree in botany and a Doctor of Philosophy (PhD) degree in 1964.

== Academic career ==
Casselton began her career in lecturing and research as an assistant lecturer at Royal Holloway College in London. She was Professor of Genetics at Queen Mary University of London from 1989 to 1991 and was later awarded an AFRC/BBSRC Postdoctoral Fellowship, followed by a BBSRC Senior Research Fellowship in 1995.

Casselton was a Fellow of St Cross College Oxford from 1993 to 2003, and was appointed Professor of Fungal Genetics at Oxford in 1997. Her specialism was sexual development in fungi and she contributed to over 100 publications on this topic. She was a Fellow of St Cross College, Oxford, from 1993 to 2003, and an Honorary Fellow of St Hilda's College, Oxford, from 2000. She was a member of the Royal Society's Council from 2002 to 2003, and rejoined the Council in 2006 as Vice-President and Foreign Secretary, replacing Professor Dame Julia Higgins.

As Foreign Secretary of the Royal Society, Casselton gave the Royal Society Rutherford Lecture in South Africa and the Blackett Lecture in India, travelling to 27 different countries during three and a half years in office.

== Personal life ==
She married Peter John Casselton in 1961, divorcing him in 1978. She married William Joseph Dennis Tollett in 1981. She died after a short illness, aged 75.

== Awards and honours ==
She was elected a Fellow of the Royal Society in 1999. She became a Member of the Academia Europaea in 2008, and was awarded an Honorary Doctor of Science by Queen Mary College, University of London in 2009 and University College London in September 2010. She was appointed Commander of the Order of the British Empire (CBE) in the 2012 Birthday Honours for services to fungal genetics and international science. Her nomination for the Royal Society reads:

Distinguished for her genetical and molecular analysis of the mushroom Coprinus cinereus, in particular of the incompatibility mating type factors, A and B. She made diploids which she used to demonstrate for the first time that hyphal fusion, nuclear migration, the formation of a dikaryon ending in sexual reproduction are all controlled by a positive stimulus triggered by the meeting of unlike alleles of the A and B factors. This is in contrast to the oppositional inhibition of the final stages of sexual reproduction by the meeting of like alleles in flowering plants. Using elegant genetic and molecular techniques with different genetic stocks including gene deletions and gene fusions, she has shown that the A factor is a supergene of several multiallelic genes encoding proteins with homeodomains binding to DNA. These trigger sexual development by the association of A proteins with different homeodomains sequences (HD1 and HD2). A factors contain several duplicate genes coding for the A protein but it is only necessary for any one of these genes to be allelic unmatched to trigger the whole sexual development. Other domains characteristic of transcription factors found in mammalian cells suggest that helical regions adjacent to the homeodomain may discriminate between compatible and incompatible protein associations.

The British Mycological Society awarded her an Honorary Membership in 2002.

== Selected publications ==
- Stajich, J. E.; Wilke, S. K.; Ahren, D.; Au, C. H.; et al. (14 June 2010). "Insights into evolution of multicellular fungi from the assembled chromosomes of the mushroom Coprinopsis cinerea (Coprinus cinereus)". Proceedings of the National Academy of Sciences. 107 (26): 11889–11894. doi:10.1073/pnas.1003391107. ISSN 0027-8424. PMC 2900686. PMID 20547848.
- Riquelme, Meritxell; Challen, Michael P.; Casselton, Lorna A.; Brown, Andrew J. (6 May 2005). "The Origin of MultipleBMating Specificities inCoprinus cinereus". Genetics. 170 (3). Oxford University Press (OUP): 1105–1119. doi:10.1534/genetics.105.040774. ISSN 0016-6731. PMC 1451185. PMID 15879506.
- Casselton, LA. (2002). "Mate recognition in fungi". Heredity. 88 (2): 142–147. Bibcode:2002Hered..88..142C. doi:10.1038/sj.hdy.6800035. PMID 11932772.
- Brown, AJ; Casselton, LA. (2001). "Mating in mushrooms: increasing the chances but prolonging the affair". Trends in Genetics. 17 (7): 393–400. doi:10.1016/s0168-9525(01)02343-5. PMID 11418220.
- Olesnicky, NS.; Brown, AJ.; Dowell, SJ.; Casselton, LA. (1999). "A constitutively active G-protein-coupled receptor causes mating self-compatibility in the mushroom Coprinus". EMBO Journal. 18 (10): 2756–2763. doi:10.1093/emboj/18.10.2756. PMC 1171357. PMID 10329622.
- Casselton, LA.; Olesnicky, NS. (1998). "Molecular genetics of mating recognition in basidiomycete fungi". Microbiology and Molecular Biology Reviews. 62 (1): 55–70. doi:10.1128/mmbr.62.1.55-70.1998. PMC 98906. PMID 9529887.
- Banham, AH.; Asanteowusu, RN.; Casselton, LA. (1995). "An N-terminal dimerization domain permits homeodomain proteins to choose compatible partners and initiate sexual development in the mushroom Coprinus cinereus". Plant Cell. 7 (6): 773–783. doi:10.1105/tpc.7.6.773. PMC 160831. PMID 12242384.
- Kues, U.; Casselton, LA. (1992). "Fungal mating type genes - regulators of sexual development". Mycological Research. 96 (12): 993–1006. doi:10.1016/s0953-7562(09)80107-x.
- Kues, U.; Richardson, WVJ; Casselton, LA. (1992). "The combination of dissimilar alleles of the A-alpha and A-beta gene complexes, whose proteins contain homeo domain motifs, determines sexual development in the mushroom Coprinus cinereus". Genes & Development. 6 (4): 568–577. doi:10.1101/gad.6.4.568. PMID 1348484.
- Binninger, DM.; Skrzynia, C.; Pukkila, PJ.; Casselton, LA. (1987). "DNA-mediated transformation of the basidiomycete Coprinus cinereus". EMBO Journal. 6 (4): 835–840. doi:10.1002/j.1460-2075.1987.tb04828.x. PMC 553472. PMID 3595558.
- Sealy-Lewis, HM.; Casselton, LA. (1978). "Restoration of enzyme activity by recessive missense suppressors in fungus Coprinus". Molecular and General Genetics. 164 (2): 211–215. doi:10.1007/bf00267386. PMID 30040. S2CID 6010171.
- Casselton, LA.; Lewis, D. (1967). "Dilution of gene products in cytoplasm of heterokaryons in Coprinus lagopus"". Genetical Research. 9: 63. doi:10.1017/s0016672300010314.
- Casselton, LA. (1965). "Production and behaviour of diploids of Coprinus lagopus". Genetical Research. 6 (2): 190–208. doi:10.1017/s0016672300004080. PMID 14345906.
