= Laura Heyderman =

Physicist

Laura Heyderman FRS
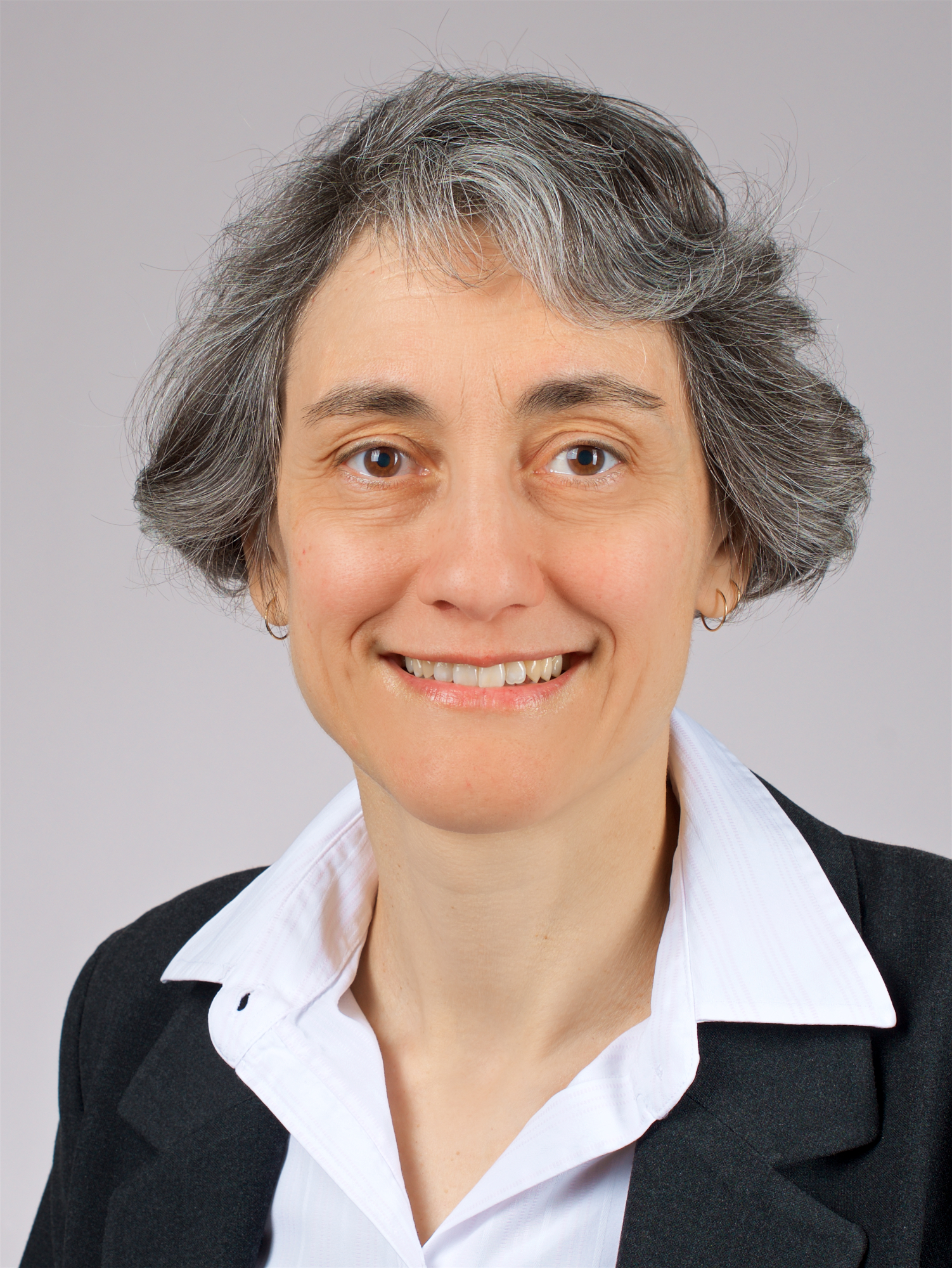
- Born: Laura Jane Heyderman
- Scientific career
- Workplaces: ETH Zurich

Laura Jane Heyderman FRS is a physicist, materials scientist, academic and Professor of Mesoscopic Systems at the Department of Materials, ETH Zurich and Paul Scherrer Institute. Her research is focused on magnetism and magnetic materials.

== Education and early life ==
She received her BSc degree in chemical physics in 1988, and PhD in physics in 1991 from University of Bristol. Her career in magnetism started with her PhD project on magnetic multi-layers that she conducted at the French National Centre for Scientific Research.

== Career and research ==
After her PhD, she worked on transmission electron microscopy of magnetic materials and observed magnetic domain configurations in a variety of materials as a postdoctoral researcher at University of Glasgow. After working in the industry for four years in the United Kingdom, she became a group leader at the Paul Scherrer Institute in 1999, Professor of Mesoscopic Systems at the Department of Materials, ETH Zurich in 2013 and Head of the Laboratory for Multiscale Materials Experiments at the Paul Scherrer Institute in 2017. She is an author of more than 150 peer-reviewed publications.

She has an expertise in mesoscopic systems, magnetic nanostructures, nanoimprint and electron beam lithography as well as magnetic thin films and nanostructures. Her research in the field of artificial spin ices consisting of interacting nanomagnets has attracted a significant interest. Her current research also includes the observation of three-dimensional magnetization structures with synchrotron X-ray tomography, chirally coupled nanomagnets and using nanomagnets for intelligent micro/nano robots.

== Awards ==
She is a member of German Physical Society and fellow of the American Physical Society, of the IEEE, and of the UK Institute of Physics. She was elected Fellow of the Royal Society in 2023.

- 2026: Charpak-Ritz Prize from the Société Française de Physique and the Swiss Physical Society
- 2016: Beller Lectureship at the APS March Meeting 2016, Baltimore, US
- 2015: Wohlfarth Prize Lecture at UK Magnetism 2015 Meeting
