= Rutherford Memorial Lecture (Royal Society) =

Annual lecture series

The Rutherford Memorial Lecture is an international lecture of the Royal Society created under the Rutherford Memorial Scheme in 1952. It is held at universities in various countries in the Commonwealth, with a stipulation that at least one of every three lectures must be held in New Zealand.

== List of lecturers ==
Year	Name	Country	Lecture	Notes
1952	John Cockcroft	New Zealand		
1953	James Chadwick	Canada		
1954	Ernest Marsden	South Africa	Rutherford, his Life and Work 1871-1937	
1955	Marcus Laurence Elwin Oliphant	India and Pakistan	Science and mankind	-
1956	Charles Galton Darwin	New Zealand	The Discovery of atomic number	
1957	Edward Neville da Costa Andrade	Australia	The Birth of the nuclear atom	
1958	Patrick Maynard Stuart Blackett	Canada		
1960	William Lawrence Bragg	New Zealand	The Development of X-ray analysis	
1962	Nevill Francis Mott	Nigeria, Rhodesia and Nyasaland, Uganda	Atomic physics and the strength of metals	
1963	Thomas Edward Allibone	India and Pakistan		-
1964	George Paget Thomson	New Zealand	Rutherford in nineteenth-century Cambridge	
1965	Philip Ivor Dee	Canada		
1966	John Ashworth Ratcliffe	Australia	Radio and the Cavendish Laboratory	
1967	Harrie Stewart Massey	New Zealand		-
1968	John Michael Ziman	India and Pakistan	Some problems of the growth and spread of science in developing countries.	
1969	Piotr Leonidovich Kapitza	Canada		-
1970	Stanley Keith Runcorn	Kenya, Tanzania and Uganda		-
1971	Peter Howard Fowler	New Zealand	Evolution of the elements	
1975	Philip Burton Moon	Australia	Yarns and Spinners:Recollections of Rutherford and Applications of Swift Rotation	
1977	Norman Feather	Canada	Some episodes of the α-particle story	
1979	Eric Henry Stoneley Burhop	New Zealand	The New Physics	
1980	David Shoenberg	India and Sri Lanka	Magnetic Oscillations in metals	
1981	Stephen Erwin Moorbath	Zimbabwe		-
1982	James Dwyer McGee	New Zealand	Rutherford, Radio and Opto-Electronics	
1983	William Ernest Burcham	Canada	Rutherford and beta decay	
1984	Alfred Charles Bernard Lovell	Australia		-
1985	Roger Elliott	New Zealand		-
1986	Rudolf Ernst Peierls	India		-
1987	Maurice Goldhaber	Canada		-
1988	Dan Peter McKenzie	New Zealand		-
1989	Samuel Devons	Australia		-
1990	Basil John Mason	Canada		-
1991	Denys Haigh Wilkinson	New Zealand		-
1992	Lewis Edward John Roberts	India		-
1993	David John Weatherall	South-east Asia		-
1995	William Hamilton	New Zealand		-
1996	John Bertrand Gurdon	Australia		-
1997	John Meurig Thomas	New Zealand		-
1999	Robert Brian Heap	South Africa		-
2000	Michael Joseph Kelly	New Zealand		-
2003	Timothy J. Pedley	New Zealand		-
2005	Alec Jeffreys	Singapore		-
2006	Paul Nurse	New Zealand		-
2007	Patrick Bateson	Australia		-
2008	Lorna Casselton	South Africa		-
2010	Lord Rees of Ludlow	New Zealand	Maths, maps and the human heart	
2013	Sir John Sulston	New Zealand	People and the planet – how can we all live and flourish on a finite Earth?	
2017	Georgina Mace	New Zealand	How should we value nature in a human-dominated world?	-
2018	Eric Wolff	Canada	Polar change – a perspective from the ice core palaeoclimate record’	-
2019	Ottoline Leyser	New Zealand	Thinking like a vegetable: how plants decide what to do	-
