= Reidun Twarock =

German mathematician

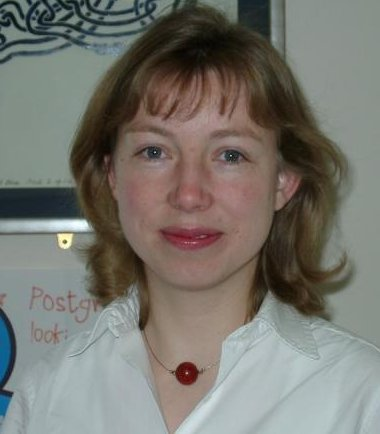
- Education: Technische Universität Clausthal
- Known for: Mathematical Biology, Virology, Bioinformatics
- Scientific career
- Fields: Mathematician, Biologist
- Workplaces: University of York

Reidun Twarock (German: [ˈʁaɪdɐn ˈtvæʁɔk]) is a German-born mathematical biologist at the University of York. She is known for developing mathematical models of viruses based on higher-dimensional lattices.

== Education ==
Twarock originally studied mathematical physics at the universities of Cologne and Bath. During her PhD at Technische Universität Clausthal she experimented with quantum mechanical models confined to the surface of a sphere.

== Research ==
In the early 2000s, while thinking about the Penrose tiling and different ways of dividing the surface of a sphere, Twarock created a model describing the exceptional structure of papovaviridae. Almost all icosahedral viruses have proteins on their capsids arranged in clusters of five and six, with a structure permitting at most 12 clusters of five, but papovaviridae, including HPV, have 72 clusters of five This protein layout did not correspond to any spherical polyhedron known to mathematics.

After this, Twarock entered virology. The structure of the virus HK97 was exceptional too, not being modelled by any goldberg polyhedron. Mathematical virology had previously only studied the surfaces of virus, using models that were tilings of the 2-sphere; Twarock hoped to go further than this, to model the three-dimensional protein structure and interior of viruses where their genome is packaged.

It was known that, using rotations, virus protein patterns could be generated from a single shape by making copies of it and moving them around in ways that preserve the symmetry. Twarock added an outward translation to this generating process, which created a quite complex patterns of points in 3D space. These patterns turned out to accurately predict the shape and size of the proteins, as well as the structure of packaged genetic material, for many viruses including Nodaviridae.

The models turned out to be useful for studying the assembly of RNA viruses, which involves proteins binding to specific parts of the genome that end up in 3-dimensional locations that can be determined mathematically. More insights were gained using the "cut and project" method of generating penrose tilings. Her models can be thought of as squashed-down three dimensional pictures of the 6-demicubic honeycomb tiling, which is a six-dimensional version of the three-dimensional Tetrahedral-octahedral honeycomb. Different viruses are modelled by different subsets of the vertices of this lattice. The viruses appear to use these patterns because they are the most stable way of connecting multiple interacting layers that all have icosahedral symmetry.

Her work has applications to the study of nanomaterials.

== Awards and honours ==
- She was awarded the 2018 IMA Gold Medal
- She was elected a Fellow of the Royal Society in 2025

== See also ==
- Papillomaviridae
- Virus
