= Claire Spottiswoode =

South African biologist

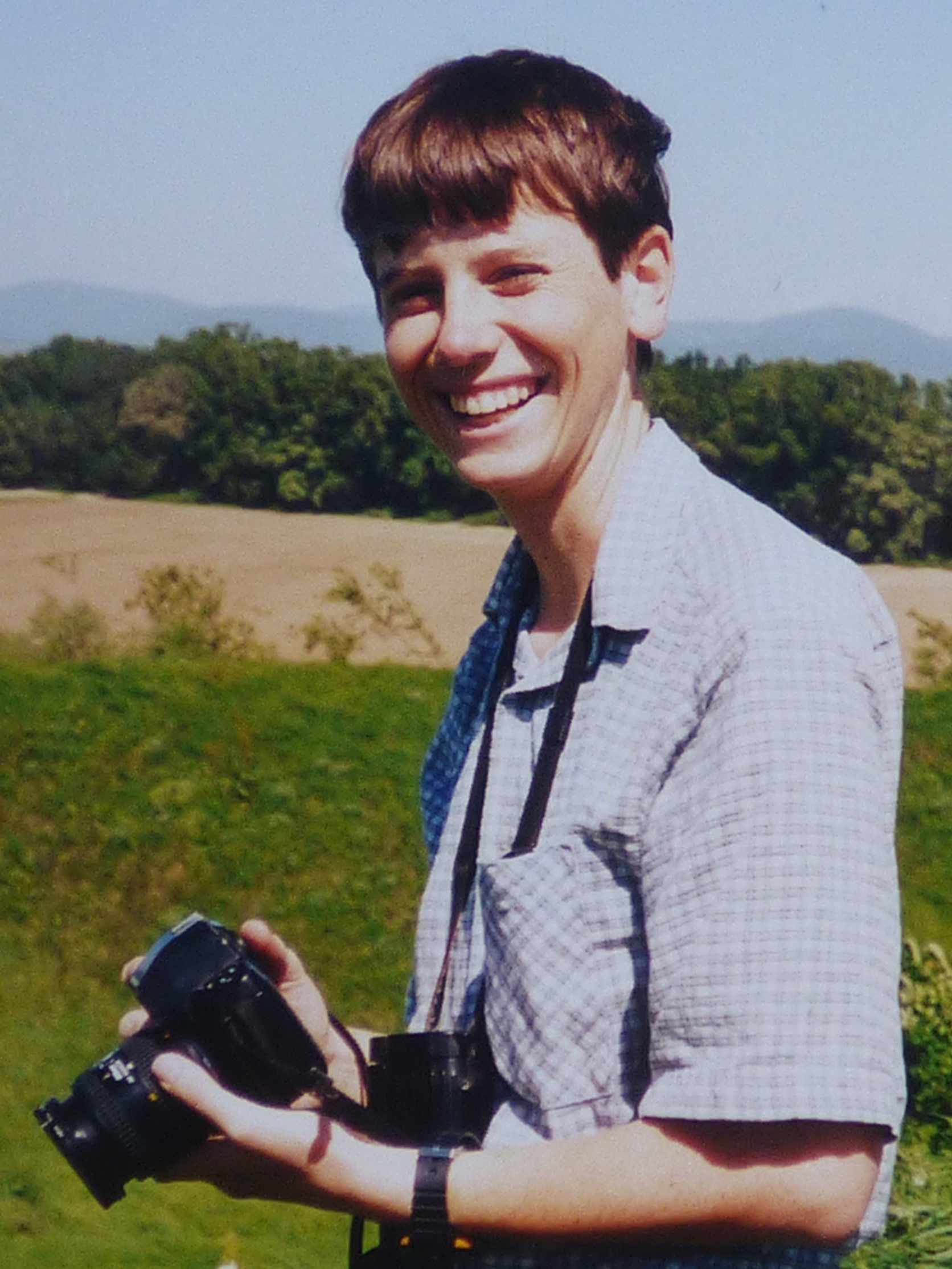
Spottiswoode in 2001

Claire N. Spottiswoode, FRS is a South African evolutionary ecologist and naturalist, specialising in African birds and species interactions. She holds the Pola Pasvolsky Chair in Conservation Biology at the University of Cape Town, and is also a visiting research associate at the Department of Zoology, University of Cambridge.

== Biography ==
Spottiswoode studied zoology and botany at the University of Cape Town, graduating in 2001 with Bachelor of Science and Honours degrees. She then undertook a Doctor of Philosophy (PhD) degree at the University of Cambridge under the supervision of Nick Davies, which she completed in 2005. Her doctoral thesis was titled "Behavioural ecology and tropical life-histories in African birds".

She remained at the University of Cambridge after completing her PhD, taking up a junior research fellowship at Sidney Sussex College, Cambridge. She held the Royal Society's Dorothy Hodgkin Fellowship from 2008 to 2013. In 2013, she was awarded a L'Oreal "Women in Science" Fellowship. By 2016, she was a senior research fellow at Magdalene College, Cambridge. That same year, she returned to the University of Cape Town to take up the Pola Pasvolsky Chair in Conservation Biology at its FitzPatrick Institute of African Ornithology. She continued her association with Cambridge as a visiting research associate in the Department of Zoology and her fellowship at Magdalene College.

In 2017, Spottiswoode was awarded the Bicentenary Medal by the Linnean Society of London. In 2025, she was elected Fellow of the Royal Society (FRS), the United Kingdom's national academy of sciences.

== Selected works ==
- Spottiswoode, C. (2004). "Extrapair paternity, migration, and breeding synchrony in birds". Behavioral Ecology. 15 (1): 41–57. doi:10.1093/beheco/arg100.
- Cohen, Callan; Spottiswoode, Claire; Rossouw, Jonathan (2006). Southern African Birdfinder: Where to find 1400 bird species in southern Africa and Madagascar. Johannesburg: Penguin Random House South Africa. ISBN 9781868727254.
- Tobias, Joseph A.; Seddon, Nathalie; Spottiswoode, Claire N.; Pilgrim, John D.; Fishpool, Lincoln D. C.; Collar, Nigel J. (2010). "Quantitative criteria for species delimitation" (PDF). Ibis. 152 (4): 724–746.
- Spottiswoode, Claire N.; Stevens, Martin (2010). "Visual modeling shows that avian host parents use multiple visual cues in rejecting parasitic eggs". Proceedings of the National Academy of Sciences. 107 (19): 8672–8676. doi:10.1073/pnas.0910486107. PMC 2889299.
- Spottiswoode, Claire N.; Stevens, Martin (2011). "How to evade a coevolving brood parasite: egg discrimination versus egg variability as host defences". Proceedings of the Royal Society B: Biological Sciences. 278 (1724): 3566–3573. doi:10.1098/rspb.2011.0401. PMC 3189372.
- Spottiswoode, Claire N.; Stevens, Martin (2012). "Host-Parasite Arms Races and Rapid Changes in Bird Egg Appearance". The American Naturalist. 179 (5): 633–648. doi:10.1086/665031.
- Spottiswoode, Claire N.; Begg, Keith S.; Begg, Colleen M. (2016). "Reciprocal signaling in honeyguide-human mutualism". Science. 353 (6297): 387–389. doi:10.1126/science.aaf4885.
