= Ravigadevi Sambanthamurthi =

Malaysian biochemist

- Born: July 13, 1955 (age 71); Johor Baru
- Education: University College London
- Scientific career
- Thesis: Chromosome mapping of 'Pseudomonas aeruginosa' PAC (1983)

Ravigadevi Sambanthamurthi (born July 13, 1955) is a Malaysian biochemist and scientific researcher at the Academy of Sciences Malaysia. She established the Advanced Biotechnology and Breeding Centre, which were the first to decode the genome of oil palm. She was elected a Fellow of the Royal Society in 2025.

== Early life and education ==
Sambanthamurthi was born in Johor Bahru. She studied biochemistry at the University of Malaya, and moved to the United Kingdom in 1979. Sambanthamurthi completed her doctoral research at University College London, where she performed chromosome mapping of pseudomonas aeruginosa.

== Research and career ==
Sambanthamurthi is the Founding Director of the Malaysian Palm Oil Board Advanced Biotechnology and Breeding Centre. Here she established the Oil Palm Genome Project, which looked to enhance the profitability of oil palm plantations. The Oil Palm Genome Project decoded the genome of oil palm. She identified the SHELL gene, which regulates thickness of the fruit shell, which impacts oil yield. By testing for SHELL DNA,

By performing epigenome-wide association studies of Elaeis guineensis, Sambanthamurthi described the 'mantled' abnormality oil palm fruit, where differentiated somatic cells (somaclonal variation) result in reduced yields.

Sambanthamurthi was the first researcher based in Malaysia to be elected a Fellow of the Royal Society.

== Awards and honours ==
- 2022 Lifetime Achievement Award In Conjunction With The Oils And Fats International Congress
- 2024 Fellow of The World Academy of Sciences
- 2024 Fellow of the Academy of Sciences Malaysia
- 2024 Invention and Design Society Luminary Award
- 2025 Elected Fellow of the Royal Society

== Select publications ==
- Kalyana Sundram; Ravigadevi Sambanthamurthi; Yew-Ai Tan (1 January 2003). "Palm fruit chemistry and nutrition" (PDF). Asia Pacific Journal of Clinical Nutrition. 12 (3): 355–362. ISSN 0964-7058. PMID 14506001. S2CID 16442592. Wikidata Q34264558.
- R Sambanthamurthi; K Sundram; Y Tan (1 November 2000). "Chemistry and biochemistry of palm oil". Progress in Lipid Research. 39 (6): 507–558. doi:10.1016/s0163-7827(00)00015-1. ISSN 0163-7827. PMID 11106812. S2CID 3968794. Wikidata Q34099065.
- Rajinder Singh; Meilina Ong-Abdullah; Eng-Ti Leslie Low; et al. (24 July 2013). "Oil palm genome sequence reveals divergence of interfertile species in Old and New worlds". Nature. 500 (7462): 335–339. doi:10.1038/nature12309. ISSN 1476-4687. PMC 3929164. PMID 23883927. Wikidata Q22122136.
