= Cristina Lazzeroni =

Italian physicist and academic

Cristina Lazzeroni, FRS is an Italian physicist and academic. She has taught at the University of Birmingham, England, since 2007, and has been Professor of Particle Physics since 2015. She is leader of its Particle Physics Group.

She studied physics at the University of Pisa, Italy, graduating with her first degree in 1992. She remained at Pisa to undertake a Doctor of Philosophy (PhD) degree in particle physics, which she completed in 1996. She then moved to the United Kingdom to be a post-doc at the University of Edinburgh. After two years in Scotland, she moved to the University of Cambridge.

In 2025, she was elected Fellow of the Royal Society (FRS), the United Kingdom's national academy of sciences.
