= Joanne Webster =

British epidemiologist

Joanne P. Webster
- Education: University of Oxford
- Scientific career
- Fields: Epidemiology
- Workplaces: University of Oxford; Imperial College London; Royal Veterinary College
- Thesis: Host-parasite interactions : epidemiology and behaviour in wild brown rats, Rattus norvegicus (1993)

Joanne P. Webster FRS FRSB FMedSci is a British epidemiologist who is the Royal Veterinary College Chair in Parasitic Diseases, Director of the Centre for Emerging, Endemic and Exotic Diseases and Professor of Infectious Diseases at Imperial College London. She is a Fellow of the Royal Society of Biology and Fellow of the Academy of Medical Sciences.

== Early life and education ==
Webster was an undergraduate student at the University of Oxford. She remained there for her doctoral research, where she studied the epidemiology of zoonotic disease. She focussed on Toxoplasma gondii and how it causes chronic disease in humans and animals. She spent a year at the NHS Communicable Disease Surveillance Centre. Webster eventually returned to Oxford for a series of postgraduate fellowships, including a Junior Research Fellowship and a Royal Society University Research Fellowship. During her fellowships, Webster expanded her research to the Global South.

== Research and career ==
In 2003, Webster joined the Imperial College London Faculty of Medicine, where she was made professor in 2006. Over a series of experiments Webster showed that toxoplasma infections can cause behavioural changes rodents, making them easier prey. It was predicted that in the brains of humans toxoplasma could cause considerable damage, including schizophrenia. At Imperial, she became co-director of the Schistosomiasis Control Initiative (SCI), which looked to eliminate parasitic disease. Over the ten years Webster was co-director, the SCI had provided over 300 million treatments to children.

Webster was made associate director of the Imperial College London, London School of Hygiene and Tropical Medicine and Royal Veterinary College London Centre for Neglected Tropical Disease Research, where she researched how to control and eliminate neglected tropical diseases.

She was made chair in Parasitic Diseases at Imperial College London in 2014, where she studied human and animal tropical medicine and serves as Director of the RVC's Centre for Emerging, Endemic and Exotic Diseases.

== Awards and honours ==
- 2005 CA Wright Medal for Outstanding Contribution to Parasitology
- 2007 National Centre for the Replacement, Refinement and Reduction of Animals in Research NC3Rs Prize
- 2013 Chalmers Memorial Medal to recognise Outstanding Contribution to Tropical Medicine
- 2019 London International Development Centre Five Inspirational Women Shaping the Future of International Development
- 2019 Fellow of the Royal Society of Biology
- 2021 Albert Nelson Marquis Lifetime Achievement Award
- 2022 Fellow of the Academy of Medical Sciences
- 2023 Royal Society Leeuwenhoek Medal
- 2025 Fellow of the Royal Society

== Selected publications ==
- Mark E J Woolhouse; Joanne P Webster; Esteban Domingo; Brian Charlesworth; Bruce R Levin (1 December 2002). "Biological and biomedical implications of the co-evolution of pathogens and their hosts". Nature Genetics. 32 (4): 569–577. doi:10.1038/ng1202-569. ISSN 1061-4036. PMID 12457190. Wikidata Q34161540.
- M Berdoy; J P Webster; D W Macdonald (7 August 2000). "Fatal attraction in rats infected with Toxoplasma gondii". Proceedings of the Royal Society B. 267 (1452): 1591–4. doi:10.1098/rspb.2000.1182. ISSN 0962-8452. PMC 1690701. PMID 11007336. Wikidata Q24670719.
- Emese Prandovszky; Elizabeth Gaskell; Heather Martin; J P Dubey; Joanne P Webster; Glenn A McConkey (21 September 2011). "The neurotropic parasite Toxoplasma gondii increases dopamine metabolism". PLOS One. 6 (9) e23866. Bibcode:2011PLoSO...623866P. doi:10.1371/journal.pone.0023866. ISSN 1932-6203. PMC 3177840. PMID 21957440. Wikidata Q35225745.
