= Deborah Ashby =

British statistician and academic

Professor Deborah Ashby OBE FRS FMedSci FRSS
- Born: Deborah Davis; 21 August 1959 (age 67); London, England
- Education: Southend High School for Girls; University of Exeter; London School of Hygiene and Tropical Medicine; Royal Free Hospital School of Medicine
- Scientific career
- Fields: Medical statistics Bayesian statistics
- Workplaces: Royal Free Hospital School of Medicine; University of Liverpool; Barts and The London School of Medicine and Dentistry; Imperial College London
- Thesis: A statistical investigation of the relationship of serum biochemistry and haematology to alcohol consumption (1983)
- Doctoral advisor: Stuart Pocock

Deborah Ashby (née Davis; born 21 August 1959) is a British statistician and academic who specialises in medical statistics and Bayesian statistics. She is the Director of the School of Public Health and Chair in Medical Statistics and Clinical Trials at Imperial College London. She was previously a lecturer then a reader at the University of Liverpool and a professor at Queen Mary University of London.

== Early life ==
Ashby was born Deborah Davis on 21 August 1959 in London, England. She was the only daughter of George Herbert Davis and Jean Davis (née Martin). She was educated at Southend High School for Girls, a grammar school in Southend-on-Sea, Essex.

From 1977 to 1980, she studied mathematics at the University of Exeter and graduated with a first class honours Bachelor of Science (BSc) degree. From 1980 to 1981, she studied medical statistics at the London School of Hygiene and Tropical Medicine and graduated with a Master of Science (MSc) degree. From 1981 to 1983, she undertook postgraduate research in medical statistics at the Royal Free Hospital School of Medicine and graduated with a Doctor of Philosophy (PhD) degree. Her doctoral supervisor was Stuart Pocock and her thesis was titled "A statistical investigation of the relationship of serum biochemistry and haematology to alcohol consumption".

== Academic career ==
Ashby began her academic career as a research fellow and honorary lecturer in medical statistics at the Royal Free Hospital School of Medicine between September 1983 and September 1986. In 1987, she moved to the University of Liverpool where she was appointed a lecturer. She was promoted to senior lecturer in 1992. In 1995, she was appointed a Reader in Medical Statistics.

She returned to London two years later, in 1997, having been appointed Professor of Medical Statistics at Barts and The London School of Medicine and Dentistry, Queen Mary University of London. In 2008, she joined Imperial College London as Professor of Medical Statistics and Clinical Trials. There, she is also the co-director of the Imperial Clinical Trials Unit. In 2018, she was appointed as the Director of the School of Public Health at Imperial. Having been interim dean since August 2023, she has served as dean of Imperial's Faculty of Medicine since 1 January 2024.

Ashby is a member of the International Society for Bayesian Analysis. She was a member of its board of directors from 2000 to 2002 and its Executive Secretary from 2004 to 2006. She was elected President of the Royal Statistical Society in 2018, and took up the position on 1 January 2019.

== Honours ==
In the 2009 New Year Honours, Ashby was appointed an Officer of the Order of the British Empire (OBE) "for services to medicine". In 2012, she was elected a Fellow of the Academy of Medical Sciences (FMedSci). Since 2018, she has been an Emeritus Senior Investigator at the National Institute for Health Research (NIHR). She was elected a Fellow of the Royal Society in 2025.

== Selected works ==
- Eldridge, Sandra; Ashby, Deborah (1999). Statistical Concepts (Master Classes in Primary Care Research). London: Royal College of General Practitioners. ISBN 978-0850842500.
- Ashby, Deborah (31 August 2006). "Bayesian statistics in medicine: A 25 year review". Statistics in Medicine. 25 (21). Wiley: 3589–3631. doi:10.1002/sim.2672. PMID 16947924.
