= Jennifer McElwain =

Irish palaeobotanist

Professor Jennifer McElwain
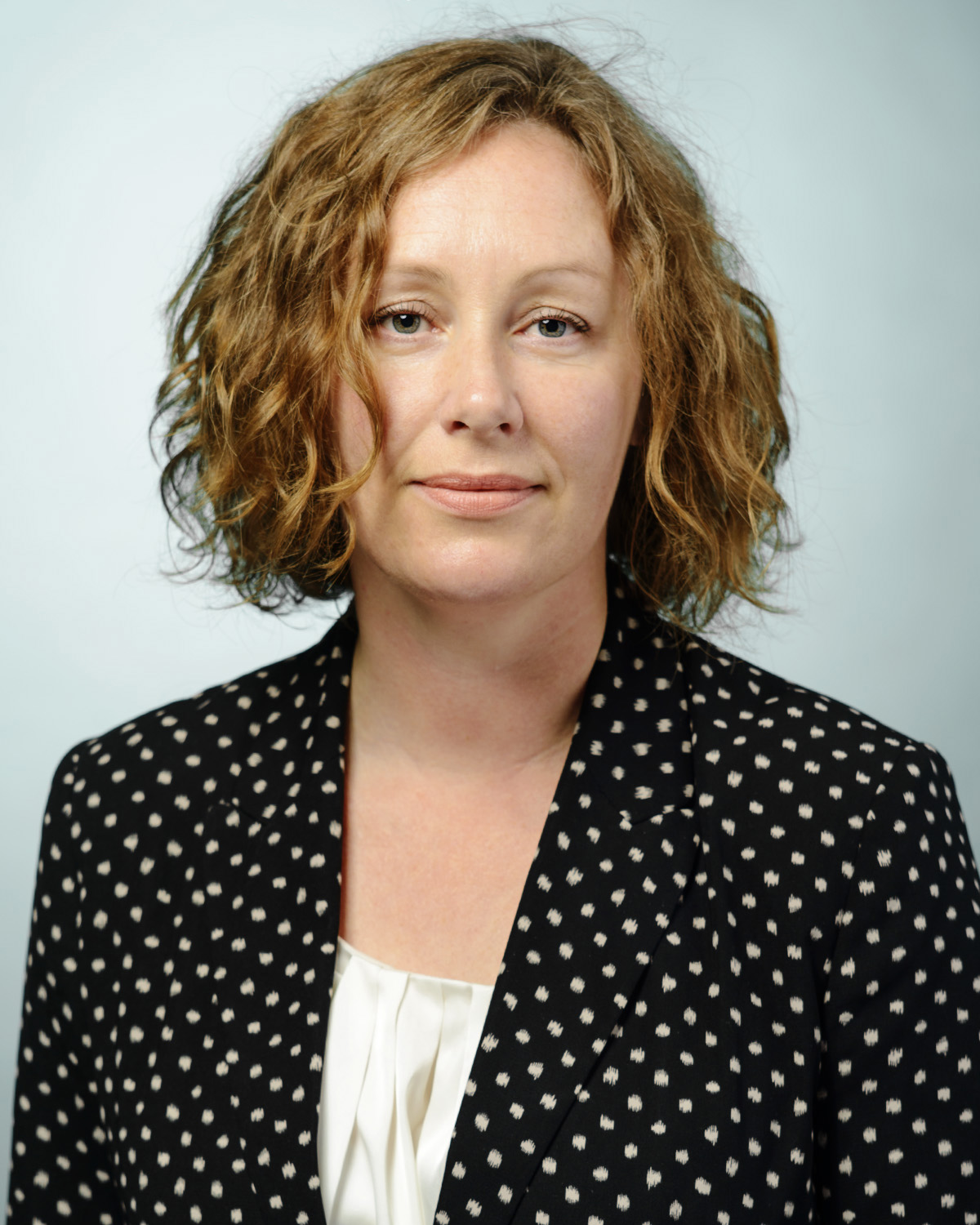
- McElwain in 2014

Academic background
- Education: BA, Botany, 1993, Trinity College Dublin; PhD, Paleobotany, 1997, Royal Holloway, University of London
- Thesis: Fossil stomatal parameters as indicators of palaeo-atmospheric CO←2 concentration through Phanerozoic time. (1997)

Jennifer Claire McElwain, MRIA, is an Irish researcher and educator, specialised in palaeobotany. She is a full professor in the Trinity College Dublin's (TCD) School of Natural Sciences, holding the 1711 Chair of Botany. She is also the Director of the Trinity College Botanic Garden. McElwain held the position of Assistant Curator of Paleobotany at the Field Museum of Natural History in Chicago between 2000 and 2003 and later that of Associate Curator of Paleobotany from 2003 until 2006.

== Early life and education ==
McElwain was born into an academic family; her father was a chemical engineer and her mother was a gardener. When speaking of her childhood, she said: "I knew the Latin names of all the plants at the age of three. It was seeded early." McElwain completed her Bachelor of Arts degree in botany from Trinity College Dublin (TCD) in 1993 and her PhD in Paleobotany in 1997 from the Royal Holloway, University of London. During her first year at TCD, she was influenced to pursue a career as a palaeobotanist after enrolling in a course focusing on quaternary palynology and geomorphology of the Irish landscape. Following this, she was a Natural Environment Research Council postdoctoral student and a Leverhulme Postdoctoral Fellow between 1998 and 2000 at the University of Sheffield. As a postgraduate student at Sheffield University, McElwain studied the impact carbon dioxide had on global warming by examining plant fossils collected in Greenland during the 1920s. In order to gather the fossils, she led a team of scientists in Greenland for one month to collect over 1,000 fossils.

== Career ==
While engaging in post-doctoral work at the University of Sheffield, McElwain also held the position of Assistant Curator of Paleobotany at the Field Museum of Natural History in Chicago between 2000 and 2003 and was later Associate Curator of Paleobotany (from 2003 until 2006). In these roles, she studied fossil leaves of plants that grew before, during and after the die-off of Triassic plants and animals. Through these fossils, McElwain found evidence of a rapid surge of seven times the normal amount of CO_{2} in the atmosphere. This included pioneering a new type of cuticle analysis that used their record of stomatal density as a proxy for CO_{2} partial pressure (pCO_{2}). In 2004, she counted stomata to know where mountains and plateaus were located in the past, presenting barriers to atmospheric circulation. Two years later, McElwain accepted a faculty position at University College Dublin and received the Award for Excellence in EU research by the President of Ireland in 2012.

McElwain continued her research into CO_{2} in the atmosphere, and led a study in 2019 which found that holly and ivy are more climate change-ready in the face of warming temperatures than birch and oak. During the COVID-19 pandemic, McElwain came up with the idea to film five-minute videos to showcase Ireland's native plants and wild places.

== Selected publications ==
- The Evolution of Plants (2002), as author (and 2nd edition in 2013)
- 14 Expeditions as editor, which she said "showcases the breadth and importance of botany as a modern science addressing global research challenges."

== Recognition ==
In 2017 she was admitted as a member of the Royal Irish Academy and elected a Fellow of the Royal Society in 2025.
