= Judith Driscoll =

Materials scientist

Judith Driscoll FRS FREng FRSC FInstP FIMMM
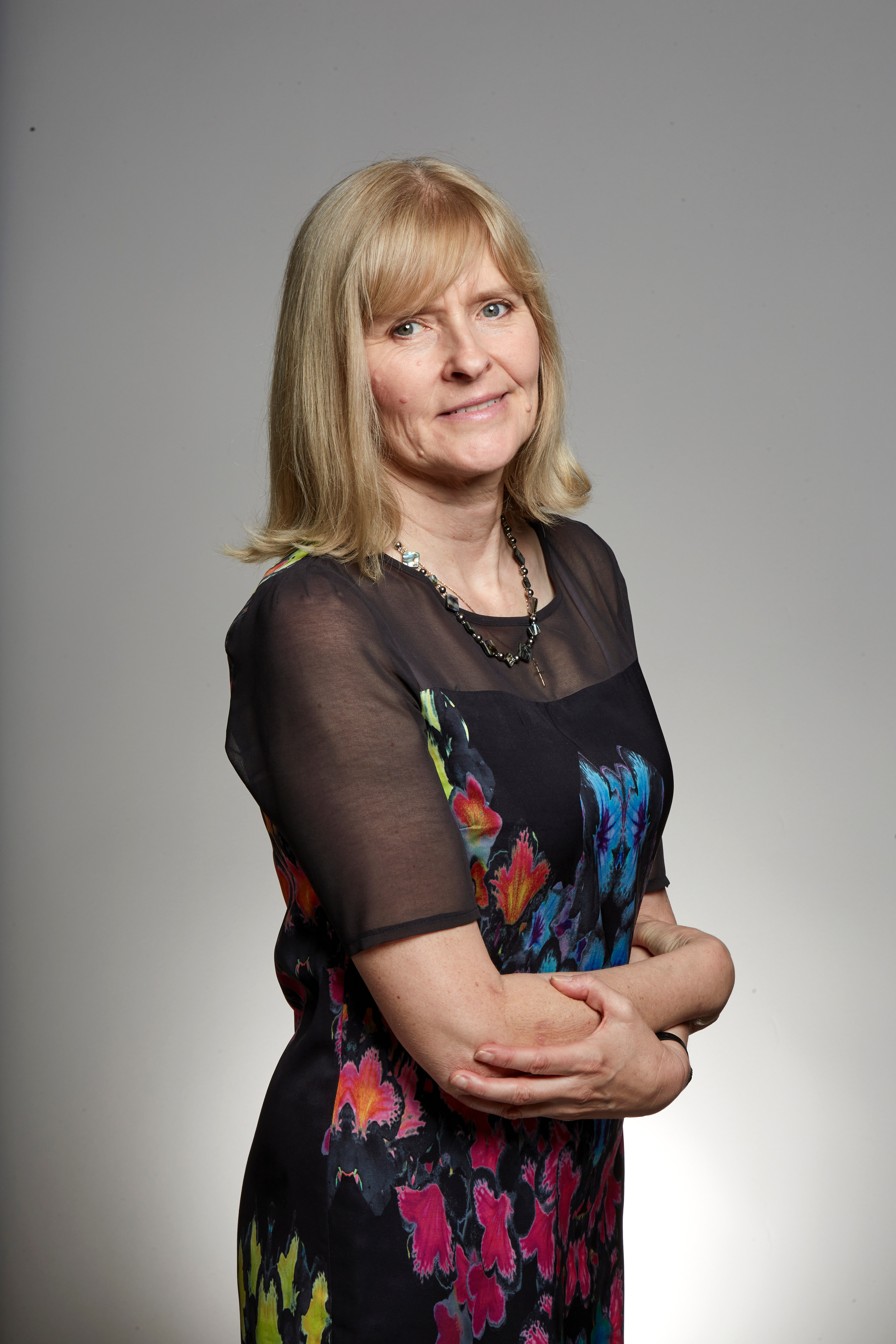
- Born: Judith Louise MacManus
- Other name: Judith MacManus-Driscoll
- Education: Imperial College London (BSc); University of Cambridge (PhD)
- Known for: Engineering thin films of functional oxides for high temperature superconductors, ferroics and multiferroics, ionics, and semiconductors
- Scientific career
- Fields: Materials Science
- Workplaces: University of Cambridge; Imperial College London; Los Alamos National Laboratory
- Website: driscoll.msm.cam.ac.uk

Judith Louise MacManus-Driscoll is a Professor of Materials Science at the University of Cambridge. Driscoll is known for her interdisciplinary work on thin film engineering. She has a particular focus on functional oxide systems, demonstrating new ways to engineer thin films to meet the required applications performance. She has worked extensively in the fields of high temperature superconductors, ferroics and multiferroics, ionics, and semiconductors. She holds several licensed patents.

== Research and career ==
Driscoll (also known as MacManus-Driscoll in her publications) earned her PhD in 1991 at the University of Cambridge under Profs. Jan Evetts and Derek Fray FRS.

From 1991 to 1995, she trained as a postdoctoral researcher at Stanford University and IBM Almaden Research Center where she worked under Ted Geballe, Robby Beyers and John Bravman. In 1995, she joined Imperial College London as a lecturer in the Department of Materials, and was promoted to Reader in 1999. She then did a sabbatical at Los Alamos National Laboratory in 2003 where she has remained a visiting staff member/visiting faculty ever since. She joined the University of Cambridge in the Department of Materials Science and Metallurgy in 2003, and was promoted to Full Professor in 2008. She is a Fellow of Trinity College, Cambridge and Royal Academy of Engineering Chair in Emerging Technologies in advanced memory materials.

Driscoll was founding editor-in-chief of the American Institute of Physics's journal APL Materials and held the position for 10 years from 2013.

== Honours and awards ==
- 2011 Elected Fellow of the American Physical Society
- 2015 Elected Materials Research Society Fellow
- 2015 Institute of Physics Joule Medal and Prize
- 2015 Royal Academy of Engineering Armourers and Brasiers' Company Prize
- 2017 Institute of Electrical and Electronics Engineers James Wong Award
- 2017 Elected Fellow of Women's Engineering Society
- 2017 Elected Chartered Engineer
- 2018 Institute of Materials, Minerals and Mining Kroll Prize
- 2018 Elected Fellow of the Royal Academy of Engineering
- 2021 Elected American Association for the Advancement of Science Fellow
- 2022 Institute of Materials, Minerals and Mining Griffith Medal
- 2022 MRSI Silver Jubilee International Medal
- 2024 Royal Society of Chemistry Interdisciplinary Award
- 2024 Women's Engineering Society Top 50 Women Engineers
- 2024 Elected Fellow of the Royal Society of Chemistry
- 2025 CNR Rao Award Lecture
- 2025 Elected a Fellow of the Royal Society
- 2026 Kobayashi Medal
