= Melissa Little =

Australian scientist and academic (born 1963)

Melissa Little AC FRS FAA FAHMS
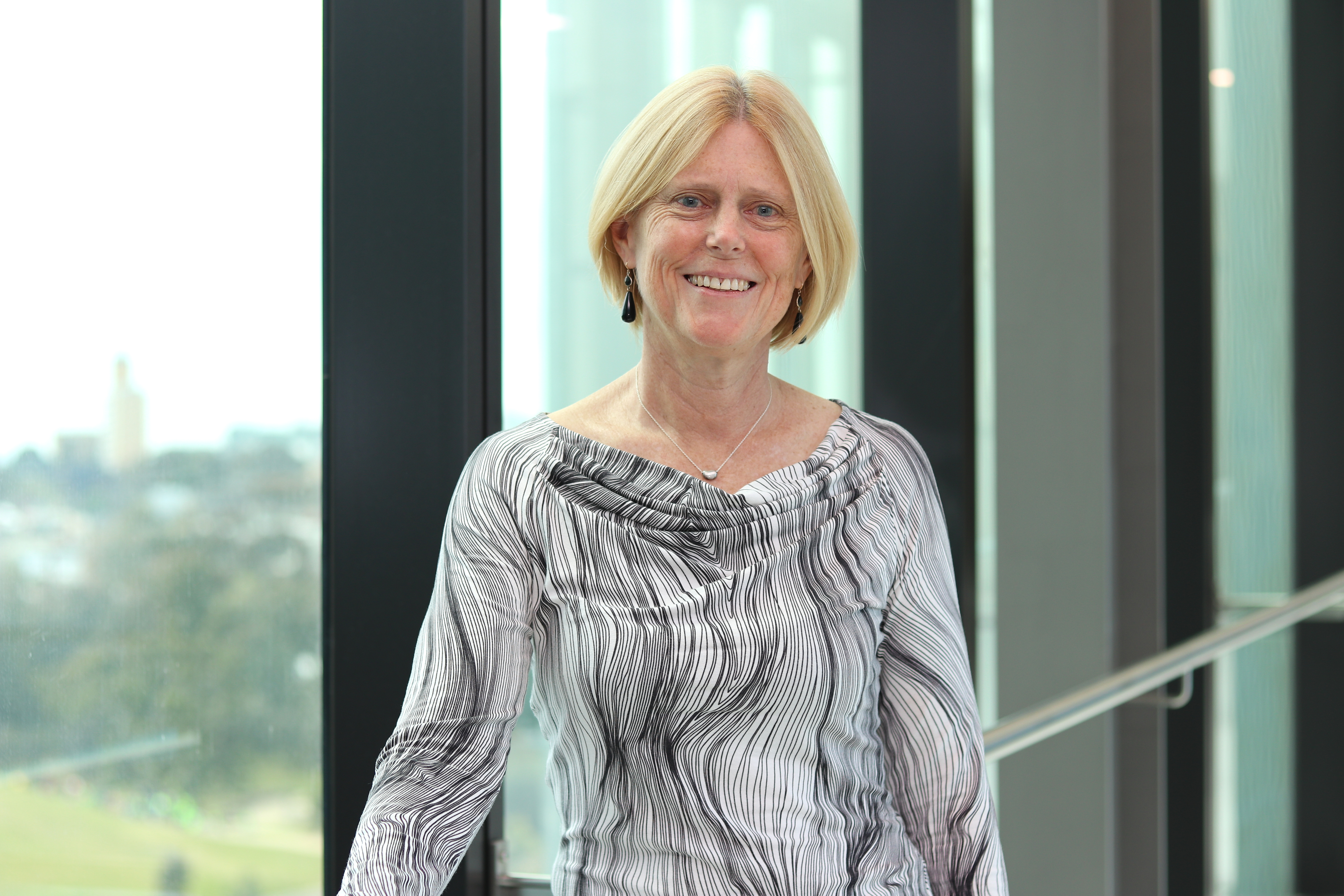
- Born: 5 December 1963 (age 62); Brisbane, Queensland, Australia
- Education: Queensland Institute of Medical Research (PhD 1990); University of Queensland (BSc 1984)
- Known for: Developing the world's first kidney in a dish
- Scientific career
- Fields: Nephrology Stem Cell Organoids
- Workplaces: University of Copenhagen, Murdoch Children's Research Institute
- Doctoral advisor: Peter Smith

Melissa Helen Little AC FRS FAA FAHMS is an Australian scientist and academic who has served as director of Cell Biology at the Murdoch Children's Research Institute since 2019. She is also a Professor in the Faculty of Medicine, Dentistry and Health Sciences, University of Melbourne, and Program Leader of Stem Cells Australia. In January 2022, she became CEO of the Novo Nordisk Foundation Center for Stem Cell Medicine reNEW, an international stem cell research center based at University of Copenhagen, and a collaboration between the University of Copenhagen, Denmark, Murdoch Children's Research Institute, Australia, and Leiden University Medical Center, The Netherlands.

She is internationally recognized both for her work on the systems biology of kidney development and also for her pioneering studies into potential regenerative therapies in the kidney. In 2015, Professor Melissa Little and her team at Murdoch Children's Research Institute produced the world's first kidney in a dish. Known today as kidney organoids, this research has become a foundation of ongoing work to find a regenerative solution for kidney disease.

== Early life and education ==
Melissa Little was born in Brisbane, Australia on 5 December 1963, the middle daughter of three girls. Her father, Ian Little, was a soils chemist with the CSIRO Cunningham laboratories. She graduated from Kenmore State High School in 1980. She completed her BSc at the University of Queensland with 1st Class Honours in Physiology in 1984. Her PhD studies were performed in the laboratory of Professor Peter Smith at the Queensland Institute of Medical Research enrolled through Biochemistry at the University of Queensland (conferred 1990). An alumna of the University of Queensland, Brisbane, Australia, Melissa worked for more than 20 years at the Institute for Molecular Bioscience, where her research focused on the molecular basis of kidney development, renal disease and repair. In 2004 she graduated from the Australian Institute of Company Directors.

== Research on kidney development, disease and regeneration ==
Little started her research career studying Wilm's Tumour, a childhood kidney cancer. She was awarded a Royal Society Endeavour Fellowship to move to the Medical Research Council Human Genetics Unit in Edinburgh to undertake postdoctoral training with Nicholas Hastie. Here she worked on the gene WT1, the gene that is mutated in a subset of Wilm's tumour patients.

She returned to Australia to continue to work on WT1, but concentrating on its essential role in the normal development of the urogenital system. Her work focuses on the molecular aspects of kidney development, with applications to stem cell biology and regenerative medicine.

Little and her team have developed an approach to recapitulate nephrogenesis, the formation of nephrons, in a dish. By knowing where the different kidney cells come from and how they develop she has developed a system to regenerate them from pluripotent stem cells. Using embryonic stem cells, or induced pluripotent stem cells from a patient, her group has described a cocktail of growth factors that can drive development into kidney cells.

The group were able to develop self organising organoids 7mm long over 18 days. These small balls of cells have differentiated most of the cells that form the kidneys, including collecting ducts, podocytes, vasculature cells, nephrons and loops of Henle, and are closely related transcriptionally to first and second trimester developing kidneys. Further research into the organoids by Prof Little's Laboratory has demonstrated robust transcriptional reproducibility of the model and utilised induced pluripotent stem cells generated from patients to study their kidney disease.

== Contributions to Australian Science policy ==
In the late 1990s, Little was a member of the Strategic Review of Health and Medical Research, chaired by Peter Wills. This review proposed a Virtuous Cycle between research, government and the commercial sector . As a result of these recommendations, the budget of the National Health and Medical Research Council was doubled over the next 10 years. She went on to serve on the Implementation Committee of that review and served under Robin Batterham, Chief Scientist, to identify strategic priorities across Australian science. A member of the NHMRC Research Committee for 6 years, she was also a member of the most recent review of health and medical research, chaired by Simon McKeon, which led to the establishment of the Medical Research Future Fund and the Biomedical Translation Fund.

== Professional associations ==
Little is the 2021-2022 President of the International Society for Stem Cell Research and Program Leader of Stem Cells Australia, an organisation that aims to "Bring together Australia's premier life scientists to tackle the big questions in stem cell science". She is also a guest editor with the scientific journal Development. She is the serving theme director of Cell Biology at the Murdoch Children's Research Institute and directs the MCRI Stem Cell Medicine Strategic Priority area. She is also the President of the Australasian Society for Stem Cell Research and a Board Member of the International Society for Stem Cell Research.

== Awards and honours ==
- 1997, Sylvia and Charles Viertel Senior Research Fellowship
- 2002, NHMRC Senior Research Fellowship
- 2004, Australian Academy of Science Gottschalk Medal in Medical Sciences
- 2004, Named in The Bulletin Smart 100
- 2004, NHMRC Principal Research Fellowship
- 2005, GlaxoSmithKline Award for Research Excellence
- 2006, Eisenhower Fellowship
- 2013, NHMRC Senior Principal Research Fellowship
- 2013, Women in Technology Biotechnology and Outstanding Biotechnology Award Finalist
- 2015, Boerhaave Professorship, University of Leiden, The Netherlands
- 2015, Fellow of the Australian Academy of Health and Medical Sciences
- 2016, Eureka Prize for Scientific Research
- 2017, Fellow of the Australian Academy of Science
- 2019, Honorary doctorate, University of Leiden, The Netherlands
- 2019, Alfred Newton Richards Award, World Congress of Nephrology
- 2020, Julian Wells Medal, Lorne GENOME Conference
- 2021, Homer W. Smith Award, American Society of Nephrology
- 2023, Companion of the Order of Australia
- 2025, Fellow of the Royal Society
