= Sue Grimmond =

New Zealand scientist and researcher

Christine Susan Betham Grimmond is a New Zealand scientist and professor of urban meteorology at the University of Reading. She has also held the post of Met Office Joint Chair. Grimmond is a pioneer of the fields of urban meteorology and micrometerology, which deal with the atmospheric boundary layer.

== Education and early career ==
Grimmond completed her BSc in physical geography at the University of Otago, Dunedin, New Zealand in 1980. In 1984, she obtained an MSc in physical geography, specialising in climatology and hydrology, from the University of British Columbia, Vancouver, Canada. She completed her PhD on evapotranspiration of urban areas at the University of British Columbia in 1989.

In 1989, Grimmond took up an assistant professor post at Indiana University, USA. In 2006 she was appointed professor and chair of physical geography in the Environmental Monitoring & Modelling Group of King's College London, UK. In 2013 she took up the post of professor of meteorology at the University of Reading.

Grimmond has undertaken visiting scientist positions at Tsinghua University, Chongqing University and Shanghai Institute of Meteorological Sciences (China), National University of Singapore (Singapore), the CSIRO Centre for Marine & Atmospheric Research (Australia), University of Gothenburg (Sweden), University of Tokyo (Japan) and Monash University (Australia).

== Research interests ==
Grimmond has contributed to wide range of topics within boundary layer and urban meteorology, publishing around 260 papers which have attracted approximately 34,000 citations, generating a h-index of 96. She has been particularly influential in understanding the effects of urbanisation on climate and the representation of urban environments within climate and weather simulations.

== Awards and honours ==
- 2025, Fellow of the Royal Society
- 2024 Silver Medal, European Meteorological Society
- 2022 Sergei Zilitinkevich Award, European Meteorological Society
- 2020 Symons Gold Medal, Royal Meteorological Society
- 2013 Chair of the World Meteorological Organization Expert Team on Urban and Building Climatology
- 2012 Ernest Frolich Fellowship, CSIRO Marine and Atmospheric Sciences, Australia
- 2009 Luke Howard Award for outstanding contributions to the field of urban climatology, International Association for Urban Climate
- 2009 Helmut E Landsberg Award, American Meteorological Society for "contributions that have greatly advanced urban meteorology & urban climate sciences, and for sustained & effective leadership that has energized the urban climate research community"
- 2008 Universitatis Lodziensis Amico Medal, University of Łódź, Poland
- 2006 Doctor of Science Honoris Causa, University of Gothenburg, Sweden
- 2006 Elected a Fellow of the American Meteorological Society
- 2003–2007 President of the International Association for Urban Climate
