= Swee Lay Thein =

Malaysian haematologist

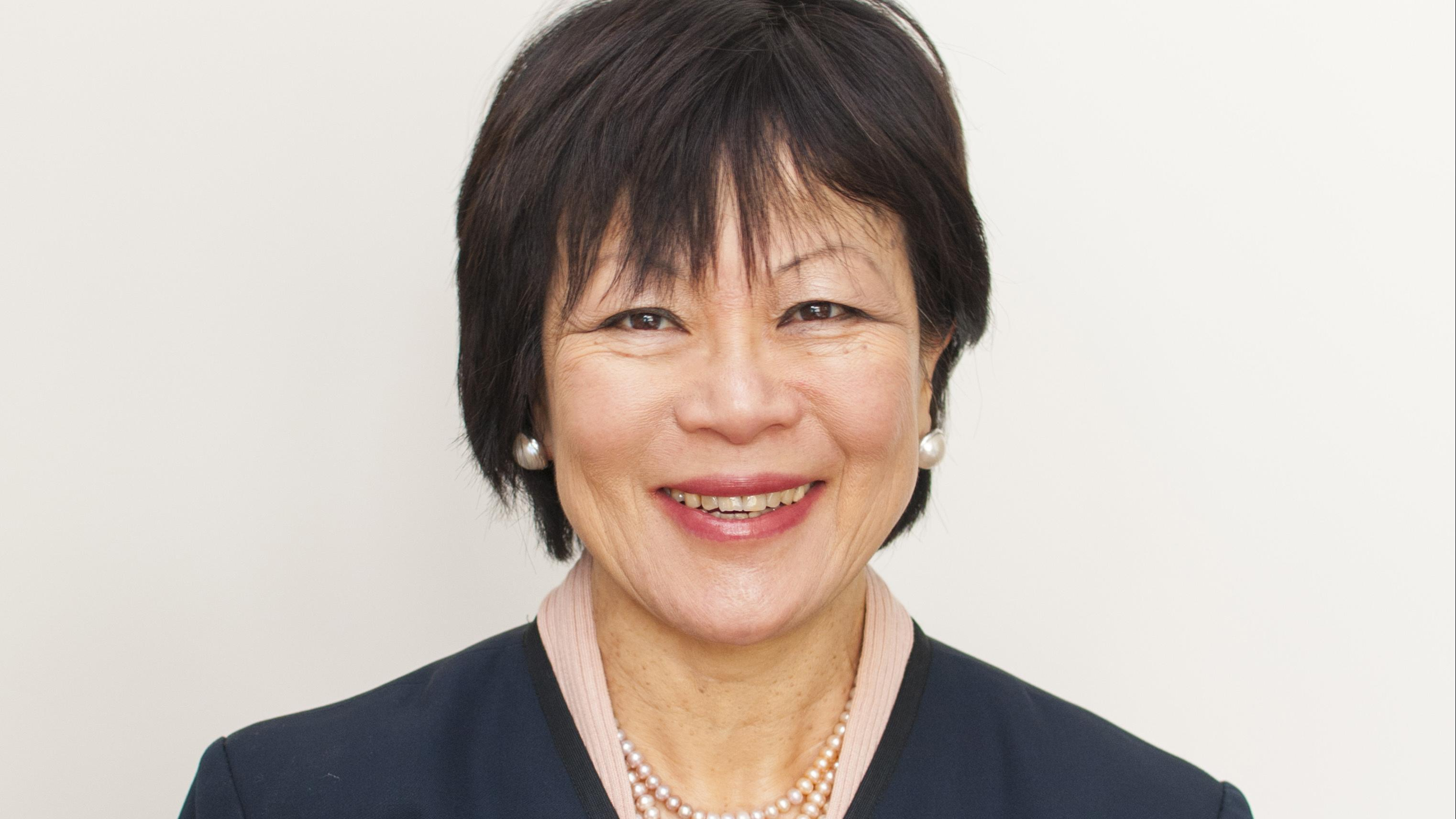
- Born: Kuala Lumpur
- Education: University of Malaya
- Known for: Sickle cell disease
- Scientific career
- Workplaces: National Institutes of Health; King's College London

Swee Lay Thein (born 1952) is a Malaysian haematologist and physician-scientist who is Senior Investigator at the National Institutes of Health. She works on the pathophysiology of haemoglobin disorders including sickle cell disease and thalassemia.

== Early life and education ==
Thein was born in 1952 in Kuala Lumpur, Malaysia. She studied medicine in both Malaysia and the United Kingdom. She graduated from the University of Malaya in 1976. She specialised in hematology at the Royal Postgraduate Medical School and the Royal Free Hospital. She moved to Oxford, where she worked at the Medical Research Council (MRC) Molecular Hematology Unit in the Weatherall Institute of Molecular Medicine and the John Radcliffe Hospital. She held various positions at Oxford, including a MRC Clinical Training position, a Wellcome Trust senior fellowship and an honorary consultancy.

== Research and career ==
In 2000 Thein joined King's College London as a Professor of Molecular Haematology. She was made Clinical Director of the Red Blood Cell clinic at King's College Hospital. Her work considers the pathophysiology of haemoglobin disorders; which include sickle cell disease and thalassemia. The only cures for sickle cell disease and thalassemia are bone marrow transplants, but these are not always available. Whilst both conditions can present with a variety of clinical severities, a remediating factor is the ability to produce foetal haemoglobin (HbF). Foetal haemoglobin is the haemoglobin that transports oxygen during foetal life and in infants until they are six months old. She has studied the mechanisms responsible for the formation of foetal haemoglobin.

Thein demonstrated that HbF levels are mainly controlled by genetics, and that majority of the genetic variance is accounted for by factors outside the globin locus. Thein used linkage analysis to identify two of the quantitative trait loci (QTL) for this HbF variability. These loci are involved with the control haematopoiesis and the production of HbF. The loci are located on the chromosomes 6q and 2p which are located within the BCL11A gene. Whilst it was known that BCL11A was involved with cancer, Thein was the first to show that BCL11A was associated with red blood cell disorders. The 6q QTL contains single-nucleotide polymorphisms distributed across three linkage disequilibrium blocks, in an intergenic region between MYB and HBS1L. Thain showed that this interval contains regulatory sequences. She has investigated how QTL regulates the expression of MYB and HBS1L. These two QTLs (6q and 2p), and a single-nucleotide polymorphism on the HBB cluster account for around half of the variability in HbF levels. She established that these two variants had spread from Africa into almost all human populations.

By delineating the genetics of foetal haemoglobin control in adults, she hopes to explain the trait variance in adults as well as identifying the loci and sequences of variants. She believes that by identifying the HbF QTLs she will be able to improve patient management through the development of novel therapies, more sophisticated genetic counselling and better predictions of disease severity. These therapies may include approaches to activate the BCL11A gene. By trying to find the relationships between genotypes and phenotypes, Thein has helped with DNA diagnostics in the haemoglobinopathies.

Sickle cell disease occurs because rigid strands form inside red blood cells, destroying their structure and resulting in the formation of sickled cell shapes. Thein is working on therapeutic agents that can work against this polymerisation, stopping the cells changing shape. Thein has served as Chair of the European Hematology Association working group on red blood cells. She has been involved with the teaching of their programs on haematology.

She moved to the National Institutes of Health as Senior Investigator and Chief of the new NIH Sickle Cell Branch in 2015.

=== Awards and honours ===
- 2001 – Elected Fellow of the Royal College of Pathologists
- 2001 – Elected Fellow of the Royal College of Physicians
- 2003 – Elected Fellow of the Academy of Medical Sciences
- 2019 – Elected Fellow of the Academy of Life Sciences for Chinese in the UK
- 2024 – Shaw Prize in Medicine
- 2025 – Elected Fellow of the Royal Society
- 2026 – Breakthrough Prize in Life Sciences
- 2026 – Warren Alpert Foundation Prize
- 2026 – Elected member of the National Academy of Medicine

=== Selected publications ===
- Thein, Swee Lay (1985). "Hypervariable 'minisatellite'regions in human DNA". Nature. 314 (6006): 67–73. Bibcode:1985Natur.314...67J. doi:10.1038/314067a0. hdl:10550/117613. PMID 3856104. S2CID 4356170.
- Thein, Swee Lay (1985). "Individual-specific 'fingerprints' of human DNA". Nature. 316 (6023): 76–79. Bibcode:1985Natur.316...76J. doi:10.1038/316076a0. PMID 2989708.
- Thein, Swee Lay (2009). "A genome-wide meta-analysis identifies 22 loci associated with eight hematological parameters in the HaemGen consortium". Nature Genetics. 41 (11): 1182–1190. doi:10.1038/ng.467. PMC 3108459. PMID 19820697.

Thein is an editor for Blood, Annals of Haematology, Hemoglobin, and the American Journal of Hematology. She is feature editor of the Sickle Blood Hub, an online space for the journal Blood.
