= Hanadi Sleiman =

Canadian chemist and academic

Hanadi Sleiman FRS
- Born: Hanadi Farouk Sleiman
- Education: Stanford University
- Scientific career
- Workplaces: McGill University; French National Centre for Scientific Research
- Thesis: "Photochemical" azo metathesis by tungsten carbenes. Generation of low valent tungsten nitrenes (1990)
- Academic advisors: Jean-Marie Lehn

Hanadi Farouk Sleiman FRS is a Canadian chemist who is Canada Research Chair in DNA Nanoscience at McGill University. Her research makes use of DNA as a template for nanomaterials. She was awarded the Natural Sciences and Engineering Research Council Polanyi Award in 2021.

== Early life and education ==
Sleiman was an undergraduate and doctoral researcher at Stanford University, where she studied tungsten nitrenes. At Stanford, she attended a lecture by Jean-Marie Lehn who discussed supramolecular chemistry. After earning her doctorate, she moved to the Louis Pasteur University as a French National Centre for Scientific Research (CNRS) Fellow, where she worked alongside Jean-Marie Lehn.

== Research and career ==
In 1999, Sleiman joined the faculty at McGill University, where she started using DNA to assemble nanomaterials. In particular she is interested in DNA structures that can target cancer cells and make them respond to chemotherapy. She has designed tuneable DNA cages and nanotubes that can encapsulate and selectively release pharmaceuticals when they encounter a biological stimulus. These non toxic cages can facilitate personalised drug delivery, that is, healthcare that is based on a person's genetics, environment or lifestyle. They can rapidly enter mammalian cells, turning on and off gene expression and modulating their behaviour. Sleiman has proposed that nucleic acids will enable precision oncology.

Sleiman has shown that it is possible to chemically imprint polymer particles with DNA strands for soft robotics. She joined the Society for the Advancement of Science and Technology in the Arab World in 2011.

== Awards and honours ==
- 2004 McGill Dawson Award
- 2009 Canadian Society for Chemistry Strem Award
- 2012 Swiss Chemical Society Lectureship
- 2016 Izatt-Christensen Award in Supramolecular Chemistry
- 2018 Netherlands Scholar Award in Supramolecular Chemistry
- 2018 Killam Research Fellowship
- 2018 Albus Award
- 2021 Natural Sciences and Engineering Research Council Polanyi Award
- 2021 Cottrell STAR Award
- 2022 Columbia University BMS Lecture
- 2023 Named a Fellow of the Royal Society

== Selected publications ==
- Aldaye, Faisal A; Palmer, Alison L; Sleiman, Hanadi F (2008). "Assembling Materials with DNA as the Guide". Science. 321 (5897): 1795–1799. doi:10.1126/science.1154533. PMID 18818351. Wikidata Q22065862.
- Faisal A Aldaye; Hanadi F Sleiman (2007). "Modular access to structurally switchable 3D discrete DNA assemblies". Journal of the American Chemical Society. 129 (44): 13376–13377. doi:10.1021/ja075966q. PMID 17939666. Wikidata Q34583813.
- Pik Kwan Lo; Pierre Karam; Faisal A Aldaye; Christopher K McLaughlin; Graham D Hamblin; Gonzalo Cosa; Hanadi F Sleiman (2010). "Loading and selective release of cargo in DNA nanotubes with longitudinal variation". Nature Chemistry. 2 (4): 319–328. doi:10.1038/nchem.575. PMID 21124515. Wikidata Q34625544.
