= Jane Hill (ecologist) =

British ecologist

Professor Jane Hill OBE FRS
- Education: University of Manchester (BSc) Bangor University (PhD)
- Scientific career
- Workplaces: Liverpool John Moores University, University of Durham, University of Leeds, University of York

Jane Katharine Hill OBE Hon.FRES is British ecologist, and professor of ecology at the University of York; research includes the effects of climate change and habitat degradation on insects.

== Education and career ==
Hill did an undergraduate degree and masters at the University of Manchester and a PhD in insect ecology at Bangor University graduating in 1991. As a postdoctoral researcher she researched the effects of climate on insects and metapopulation dynamics in butterflies at Liverpool John Moores University, the University of Leeds and Durham University.

In 2001 she moved to the University of York to be a lecturer, she became senior lecturer in 2006 and 2010 was made professor of ecology and is Deputy Head of the Department of Biology.

Hill has been Athena Swan champion in the School of Biology at York, her department was one of the first in the UK to receive the Athena Swan Gold Award in recognition of commitment to advancing the careers of women in higher education and research.

== Research ==
Hill carried out one of the first insect relocations, moving populations of Marbled white and Small skipper butterflies further north and east in the UK in 2000. The project was successful and is providing information for conservation biologists to carry out future assisted insect migrations.

Her studies on insect migration, finding that butterflies and moths can fly hundred of meters in the air to take advantage of wind to speed them up, they can also make adjustments to their direction to travel more quickly to their destination.

Hill has done fieldwork in tropical ecosystems and found that oil palm plantations can act as a barrier to the movement of butterflies into and between rainforest areas, in particular the larger butterflies, shows the importance of having a network of connected habitat patches.

Her work on the effects of climate change on biodiversity has shown that moths on Mount Kinabalu in Borneo had got smaller and moved up the mountain between 1960s and 2000s, a range shift of over 60m. British moths and butterflies respond in different ways to climate change, those species with a varied diet and higher rates of mating (such as the Green carpet and the Small dusty wave) can thrive in increasing temperatures, those such as the Pearl bordered fritilliary and the Silver-studded blue do less well as they a specialist on a few food plants and only have one generation of offspring a year.

Hill has highlighted that protected habitat areas to help maintain populations of rare species must be connected to aid migration and dispersal and should have the right climate envelopes for the species to survive future climate conditions.

== Honours and awards ==
Hill was awarded the Marsh Award for Conservation Biology in 2011 by the Marsh Christian Trust and the Zoological Society of London.

In 2015 she gave the Sir Julian Huxley Lecture at University College London and she gave the Stamford Raffles Lecture in 2016 at the Zoological Society of London.

She was made Honorary Fellow of the Royal Entomological Society in 2016 and is a Trustee of the British Ecological Society.

From September 2022 to 2024 she was President of the Royal Entomological Society.

Hill was appointed Officer of the Order of the British Empire (OBE) in the 2023 Birthday Honours for services to conservation ecology. She was elected a Fellow of the Royal Society in 2025, and also a Fellow of the British Ecological Society.
