= Martin Parniske =

German biologist

Parniske, Martin
- Education: Marburg University
- Known for: Nitrogen-fixing root nodule symbiosis of legumes with rhizobia, Arbuscular mycorrhizal, Evolution of plant root endosymbioses, Evolution of plant disease resistance genes
- Awards: 2013 European Research Council Advanced Grant, Thomson Reuters Highly Cited Researcher 2014 and 2015
- Scientific career
- Fields: Genetics, Plant Molecular Biology, Microbiology, Biotic interactions of plants
- Workplaces: LMU Munich, Fellow of St John's College Cambridge since 2017
- Website: www.genetik.biologie.uni-muenchen.de

Martin Parniske is a German biologist with a specialisation in genetics, microbiology and biochemistry. He is university professor and head of the Institute of Genetics at the Faculty of Biology of LMU Munich. Parniske's scientific focus is on the molecular interaction between plants and symbiotic and pathogenic organisms including bacteria, fungi, oomycetes and insects.

== Biography ==
Parniske studied biology, microbiology, biochemistry and genetics at the University of Konstanz and Marburg University in Germany. From 1986 until 1991, he performed diploma and doctoral studies in the laboratory of Dietrich Werner on chemical communication of the root with the bacterial microbiome with a focus on flavonoids and isoflavonoids. From 1992 until 1994, Parniske carried out biochemical studies on the interaction of plant transcription factors and DNA at the Institute of Biochemistry of the Max Planck Institute for Plant Breeding Research in Cologne, Germany as a postdoctoral fellow funded by the German Research Foundation. From 1994 until 1998, he studied the evolution of plant disease resistance genes in the lab of Jonathan D. G. Jones. In 1998, Parniske was appointed as an independent group leader at the Sainsbury Laboratory in Norwich, UK. In 2004, he accepted a call for the chair of Genetics at the Faculty of Biology of LMU Munich. From 2011 until 2013, he acted as the Dean of the Faculty of Biology of LMU Munich. As the head of the Institute of Genetics at the Faculty of Biology of the LMU Munich, Martin Parniske teaches students at the Bachelor, Master and Doctoral (Dr. rer. nat.) level. Topics taught include Genetics, Molecular Plant-Microbe Interactions, Genetics and Society, Plant Nutrition and Sustainable Food Production.

== Current research ==
Since January 2023, Parniske has been the speaker of the TRR 356 "Genetic diversity shaping biotic interactions of plants", a Collaborative Research Centre (CRC) of the German Research Foundation (DFG) that is currently in the first funding period from 1 January 2023 to 31 December 2026. The TRR356 employs a unique and novel strategy as it uses natural genetic variation as a source of discovery and a tool to decipher molecular mechanisms of plant biotic interactions. Constant molecular exchange occurs at the physical contact zone between host plants and infecting microbes leading to the co-evolution of infection and defense strategies. The outcome of this encounter is determined by various molecular actors such as chemical signals, nutrient fluxes, macromolecules and/or toxins, which are all subject to evolutionary change. The resulting diversity of genetic determinants of plant biotic interactions constitutes a molecular treasure for discovering new genes and their variants, understanding their function, and using them to improve symbiosis and pathogen defense. Parniske also contributes with the project "Sequence adaptation of Symbiosis Receptor-like Kinase (SymRK) enabling nitrogen-fixing root nodule development" to the TRR356.

== Scientific contribution ==
=== Genetics of plant root endosymbiosis ===
Parniske identified a set of plant mutants defective in plant root symbioses with both arbuscular mycorrhiza fungi and nitrogen-fixing rhizobia bacteria. These mutants enforced the idea that plant root endosymbioses with bacteria and fungi share a common genetic basis. Because arbuscular mycorrhiza dates back to the first land plant and the root nodule symbiosis is much younger, this common gene set revealed that the nitrogen-fixing root nodule symbiosis evolved by co-opting genes from the existing arbuscular mycorrhizasymbiosis. By map-based identification of so-called “common symbiosis genes”, the Parniske lab contributed to the identification of several components directly or indirectly involved in a plant signal transduction process required for both symbioses. These include a receptor-like kinase, nucleoporins, potassium channels required for nuclear calcium oscillations and a nuclear localized complex comprising a calcium-and-calmodulin dependent protein kinase and its phosphorylation target CYCLOPS, a DNA-binding transcriptional activator. The discovery of these genes and the postulated signal transduction processes had a major impact on this research field. The Parniske lab discovered that CYCLOPS is an interactor and phosphorylation substrate of the calcium- and calmodulin-dependent protein kinase CCaMK. Moreover, the role of CYCLOPS, initially annotated as a protein with unknown function, was identified as a DNA-binding transcriptional activator. Research in the Parniske lab clarified the role of the CCaMK/CYCLOPS complex as a major regulatory hub in symbiotic signal transduction.

=== Evolution of plant disease resistance genes ===
Parniske joined the laboratory of the plant geneticist Jonathan D.G. Jones at the Sainsbury Laboratory in Norwich, United Kingdom in November 1994. He addressed the fundamental question in plant disease resistance research, how plants can keep pace with the evolutionary speed of microbial pathogens that have a much shorter generation time than their host plants and thus evade recognition by plant receptors through diversifying selection. Parniske discovered that recombination within and between resistance gene clusters is a key to the evolution of novel recognition specificities of pathogenic microbes by plants.

=== Chemical communication between bacteria and plant roots ===
During his doctoral work Parniske observed that incompatible genotypes of soybean and rhizobia can lead to the induction of defense responses inside root nodules including the accumulation of phytoalexins, plant toxins produced upon biotic stress. Parniske discovered that the soybean phytoalexin glyceollin is toxic for soybean rhizobia and that low concentrations of isoflavonoids secreted by soybean roots induce a resistance against this antibiotic plant compound.

== Awards ==
In 2013, Parniske received the European Research Council Advanced Grant for research on the “Evolution of the molecular mechanisms underlying the nitrogen-fixing root nodule symbiosis”. He received postdoctoral fellowships from the German Research Foundation (DFG), the EMBO and the European Union. In 2014, Parniske received the Thomson Reuters Highly Cited Researcher award in recognition of ranking among the top 1% of researchers for most cited documents in the field of animal and plant sciences.

== Selected publications ==
- List of publications, Research Gate
- List of publications, ORCID
- List of publications Thomson Reuters Researcher ID
- Martin Parniske publications indexed by Google Scholar
