= Blue tomato =

Various tomato cultivars

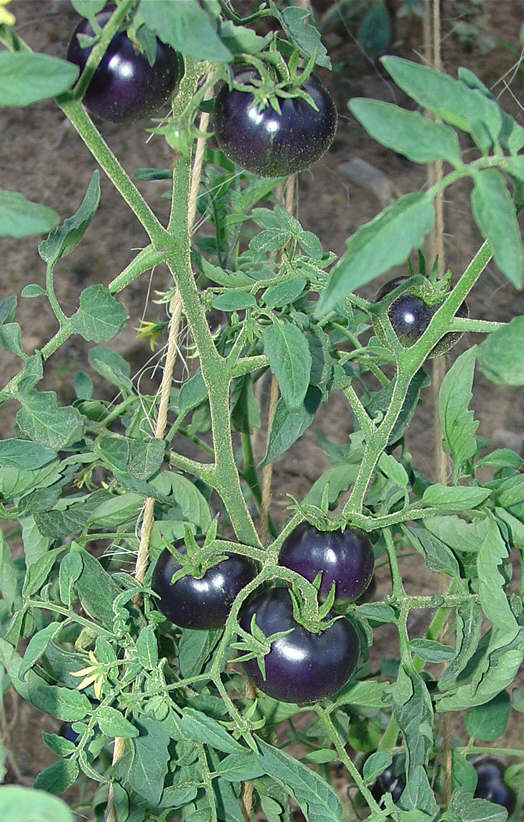
Blue tomato (P20) from Oregon State University

Blue tomatoes, also called purple tomatoes, are tomatoes that have been bred to produce high levels of anthocyanins, a class of pigments responsible for the blue and purple colours of many fruits, including blueberries, blackberries and chokeberries. Anthocyanins may provide protection for the plant against insects, diseases, and ultraviolet radiation. Some of these tomatoes have been commercialized under the names "Indigo Rose" and "SunBlack".

== Conventional breeding ==
While tomatoes have the genes for producing anthocyanins, these genes are typically not expressed in the fruit in most commercial varieties. The result is that the pigments are limited to leaves and stems, where they are not eaten. As of the 2012 growing season, Oregon State University developed blue tomato seeds became commercially available under the cultivar name "Indigo Rose". The blue color is produced mostly by the anthocyanin petunidin on the outside of the tomato where the fruit is exposed to direct sunlight. The shaded side of the fruit is green when unripe, red when ripe, and the inside is red or deep pink. The tomatoes are small, about 2 inches across, round, and grow in clusters of 6 to 8. Flavor is described as slightly acidic. The vines are said to be indeterminate but compact, and disease resistant. While the concentration of anthocyanins is still very low compared to other fruits like blueberries, the pigments do improve the resistance of the fruits to the fungus Botrytis cinerea.

== Biotechnology ==
Purple tomatoes have been developed at the John Innes Centre in the UK using genetic modification (GM), incorporating genes from snapdragons to increase the anthocyanin levels in the flesh of the tomatoes. While both the conventionally-bred and the engineered varieties exhibit altered expression of the same transcription factor of the MYB gene class which controls the anthocyanin biosynthesis, the engineered variety additionally produces the pigments in the flesh of the fruit rather than just the skin. This results in almost 100-fold higher concentration of anthocyanins in the engineered fruits compared to the conventional varieties. The inventors of the GM purple tomato, Jonathan D. G. Jones and Cathie Martin of the John Innes Centre, founded a company called Norfolk Plant Sciences to commercialize the purple tomato. In 2014, it was announced that they had partnered with a greenhouse farm in Canada to grow purple tomatoes from which to create new commercial products, but no further announcements were made. In September 2022, the Norfolk Plant Sciences Purple Tomato received USDA approval for distribution in the United States.

== Difference from black cultivars ==
Many other tomato cultivars have names indicative of their dark color, such as Black Krim and Cherokee purple. These colours come from an altogether different process, whereby the chlorophyll is not efficiently degraded resulting in the accumulation of the pigment pheophytin in the fruit. This pigment combined with other carotenoids in the fruit, including beta-carotene and lycopene, produces a brown or black color.

== Additional images ==
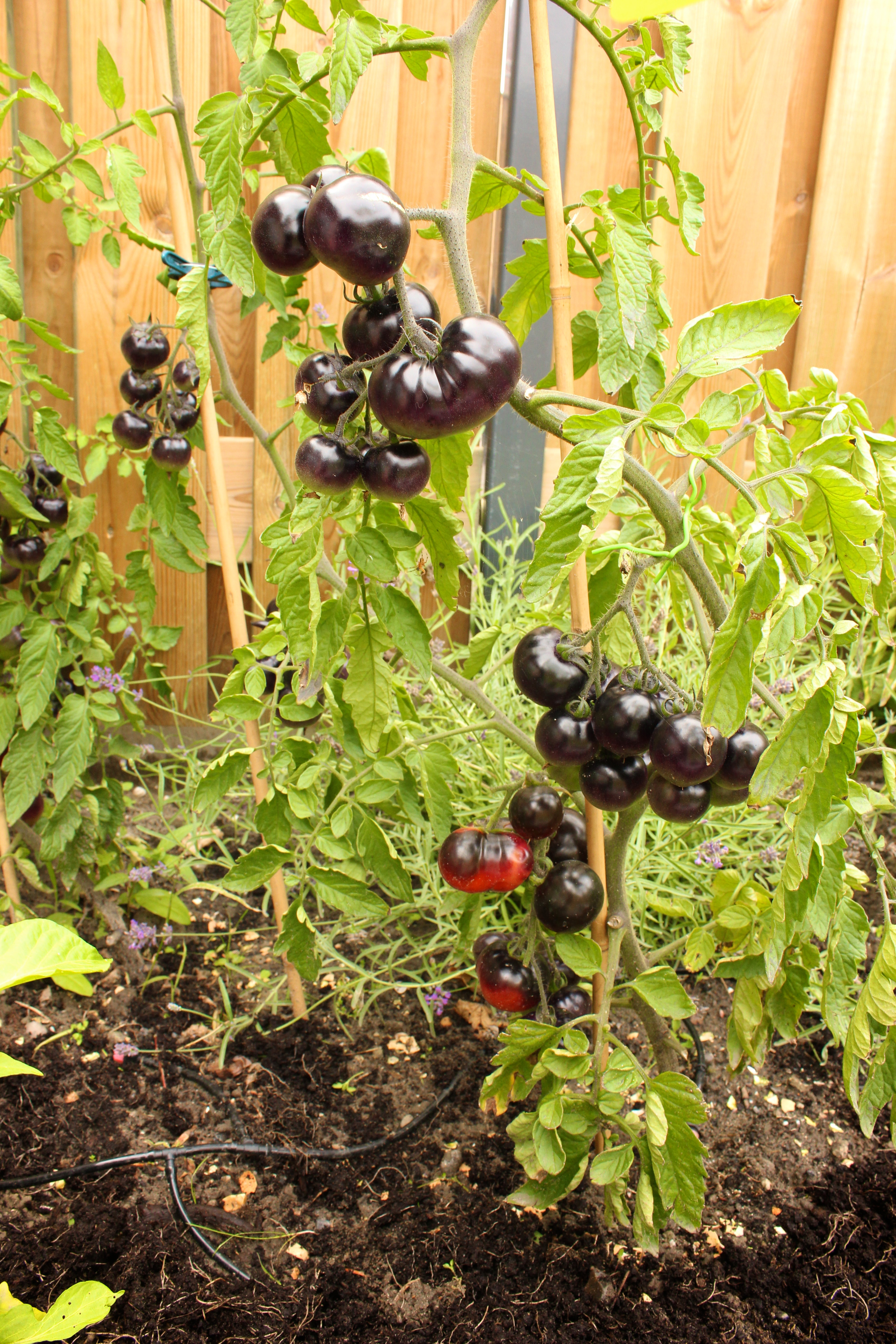
Blue bayou tomato plant

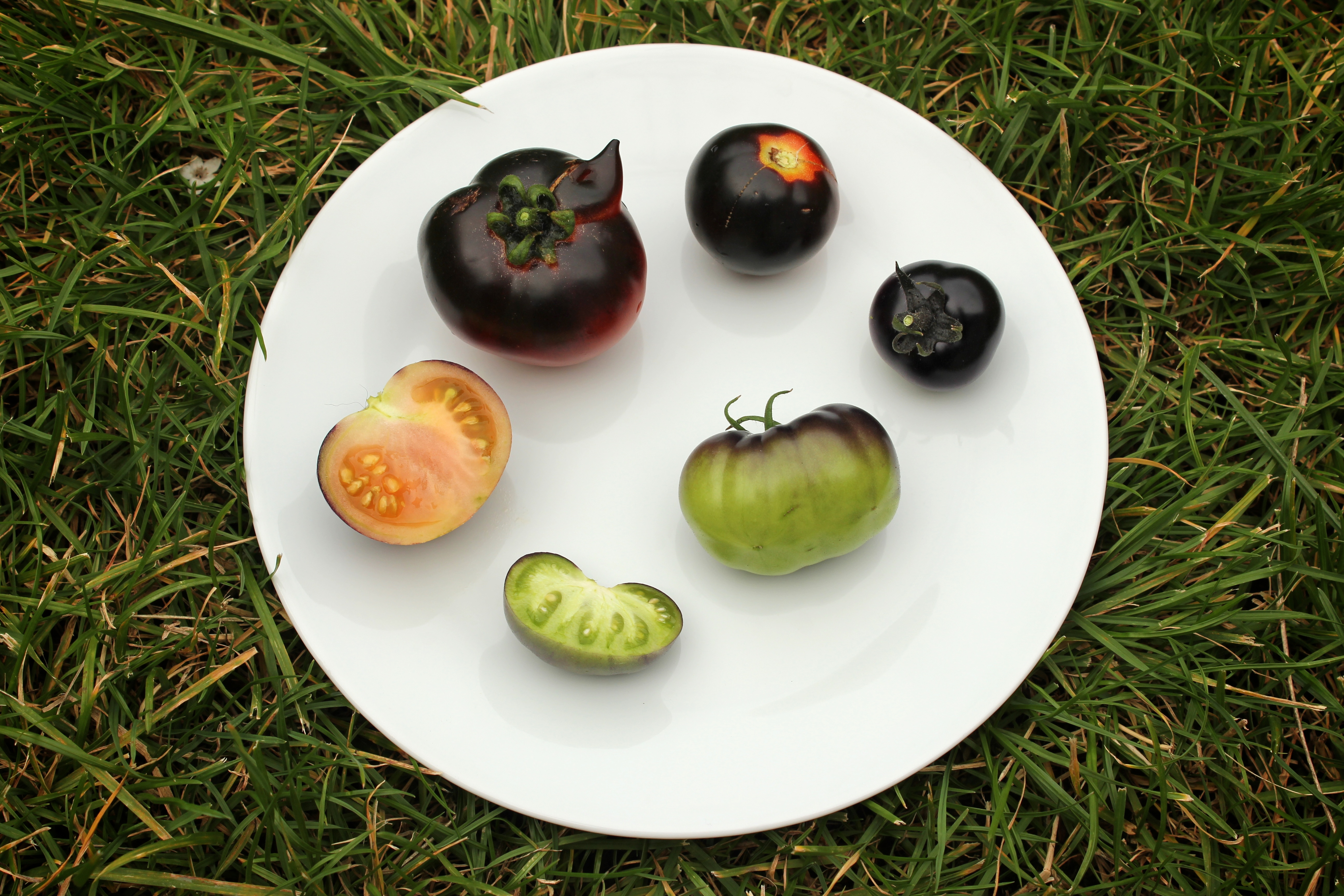
Blue bayou tomatoes on plate
