= Cathie Martin =

British botanist (born 1955)

Cathie Martin MBE FRS
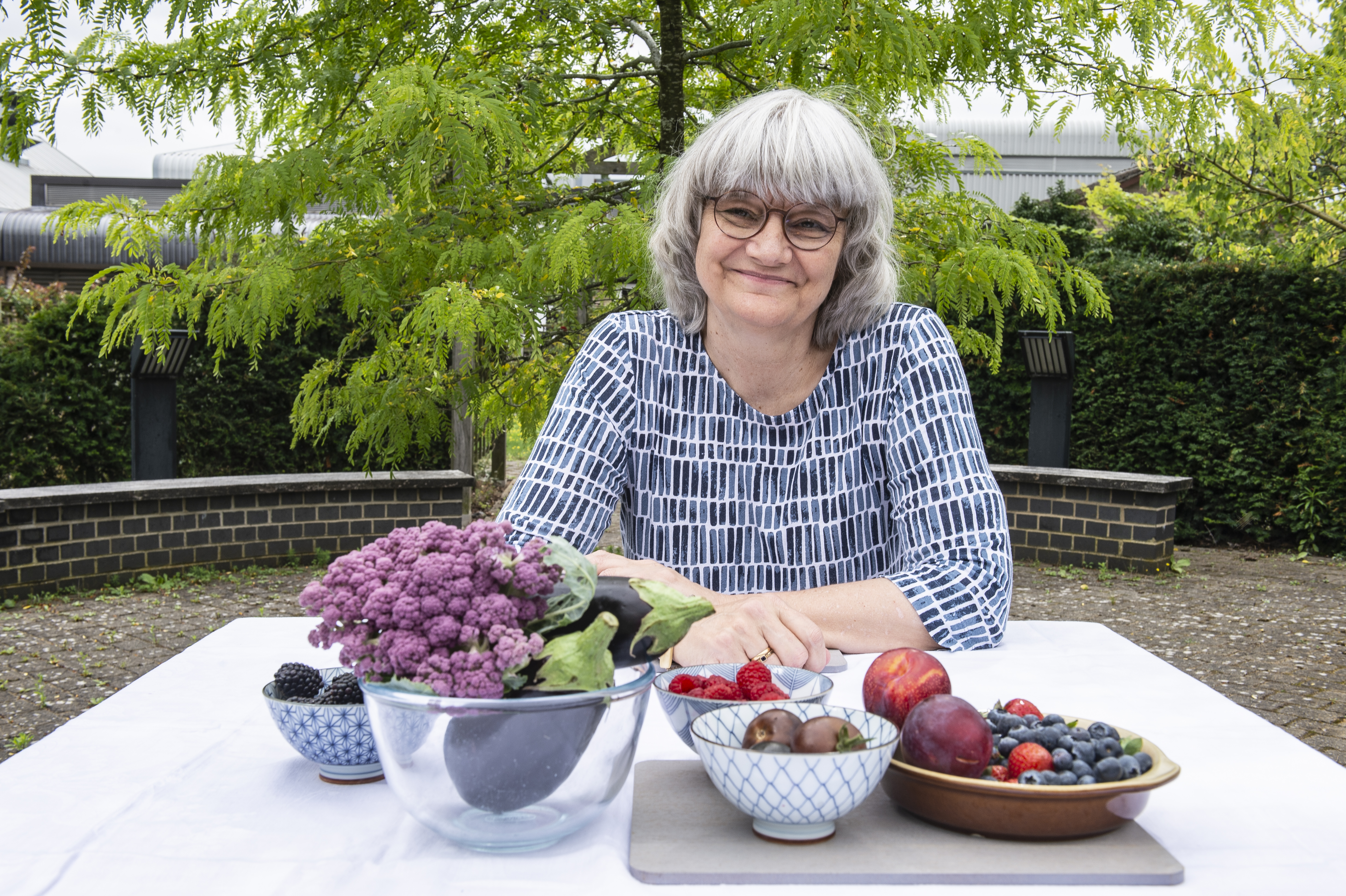
- Cathie Martin in 2021
- Born: Catherine Rosemary Martin; April 1955 (age 71)
- Education: University of Cambridge (BA, PhD)
- Known for: Blue tomato
- Awards: EMBO Member (2011); Rank Prize for Nutrition (2021)
- Scientific career
- Fields: Plant Biology
- Workplaces: University of East Anglia; John Innes Centre
- Thesis: Plant cell differentiation during seed germination (1981)
- Notable students: Beverley Glover
- Website: www.jic.ac.uk/people/cathie-martin

Catherine Rosemary Martin (born April 1955) is a Professor of Plant Sciences at the University of East Anglia (UEA) and project leader at the John Innes Centre, Norwich, co-ordinating research into the relationship between diet and health and how crops can be fortified to improve diets and address escalating chronic disease globally.

== Education ==
Martin received a first class honours degree in Natural Sciences from the University of Cambridge. She then went on to obtain her PhD in Biochemistry in 1981, also from Cambridge.

== Research and career ==
Her research has included work on blood oranges and high anthocyanin purple tomatoes.

After a period as a postdoctoral research fellow at the University of Cambridge she moved to the John Innes Centre's department of genetics in 1983. She was the first to identify genes which regulated cell shape in plants.

Since 2000, Cathie's research has focused on diet and health, researching how crops can be fortified to combat chronic disease across the world. This research has focused on plants which contain natural chemical compounds, which can be seen as 'natural medicines'. In 2022 Martin's laboratory produced genetically manipulated tomatoes containing high levels of a precursor to vitamin D. These were scheduled for field trials, and intended to improve dietary intake of vitamin D.

With Liam Dolan, Alison Mary Smith, George Coupland, Nicholas Harberd, Jonathan Jones, Robert Sablowski and Abigail Amey she is a co-author of the textbook Plant Biology.

She was the editor-in-chief of The Plant Cell, as well as the first woman and first non-American to hold this post. She holds seven patents and co-founded the University spin-off company Norfolk Plant Sciences with Jonathan Jones, to bring the benefits of plant biotechnology to Europe and the United States. Her former doctoral students include Beverley Glover.

=== Awards and honours ===
Martin was appointed a Member of the British Empire (MBE) in the 2013 Birthday Honours for "services to plant biotechnology" and the Biotechnology and Biological Sciences Research Council (BBSRC) most promising innovator 2014. Cathie's research into Purple Tomatoes gained her and Eugenio Butelli BBSRC's most promising innovator award in 2014. She has also been recognised by:

- Society for Experimental Biology (SEB) President's Medal, 1990
- Awarded EMBO Membership in 2011
- Awarded fellowship of the American Association for the Advancement of Science (FAAAS), 2012
- Member of the Order of the British Empire (MBE), 2013
- BBSRC most promising innovator, 2014
- Made fellow of American Society of Plant Biologists 2017
- Elected a Fellow of the Royal Society (FRS) in 2018
- Awarded the Rank Prize for Nutrition in 2021
