= Sophien Kamoun =

Tunisian biologist and geneticist

Sophien Kamoun FRS MAE
- سفيان كمون
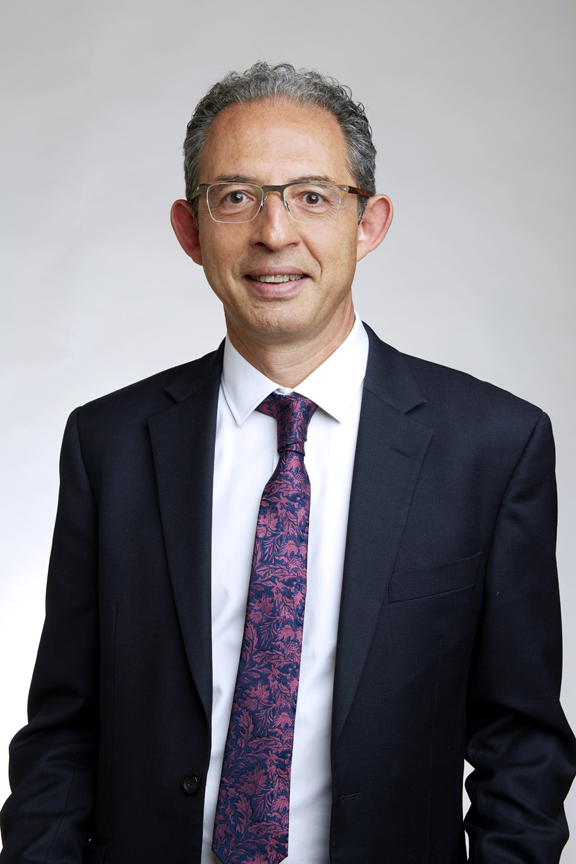
- Kamoun in 2018
- Born: 8 December 1965 (age 60)
- Education: Pierre and Marie Curie University (BSc); University of California, Davis (PhD)
- Awards: Daiwa Adrian Prize (2010); EMBO Member (2015); Linnean Medal (2018)
- Scientific career
- Fields: Plant pathology
- Workplaces: Sainsbury Laboratory; University of East Anglia; John Innes Centre; Wageningen University and Research; Ohio State University
- Thesis: Genetic analysis of pathogenicity of Xanthomonas campestris (1991)
- Website: kamounlab.net

Sophien Kamoun (Arabic: سفيان كمون; born 8 December 1965) is a Tunisian biologist. He is a senior scientist at The Sainsbury Laboratory and professor of biology at the University of East Anglia (UEA). Kamoun is known for contributions to understanding plant diseases and plant immunity. He is a co-founder of Resurrect Bio and the nonprofit GetGenome, and he is a leading advocate of open science, preprints, and transparent peer review.

== Early life and education ==
Kamoun grew up in Tunisia. He studied at the Pierre and Marie Curie University in Paris and then at the University of California, Davis where he obtained a PhD in 1991 for genetic analysis of pathogenicity of the bacteria, Xanthomonas campestris.

== Research and career ==
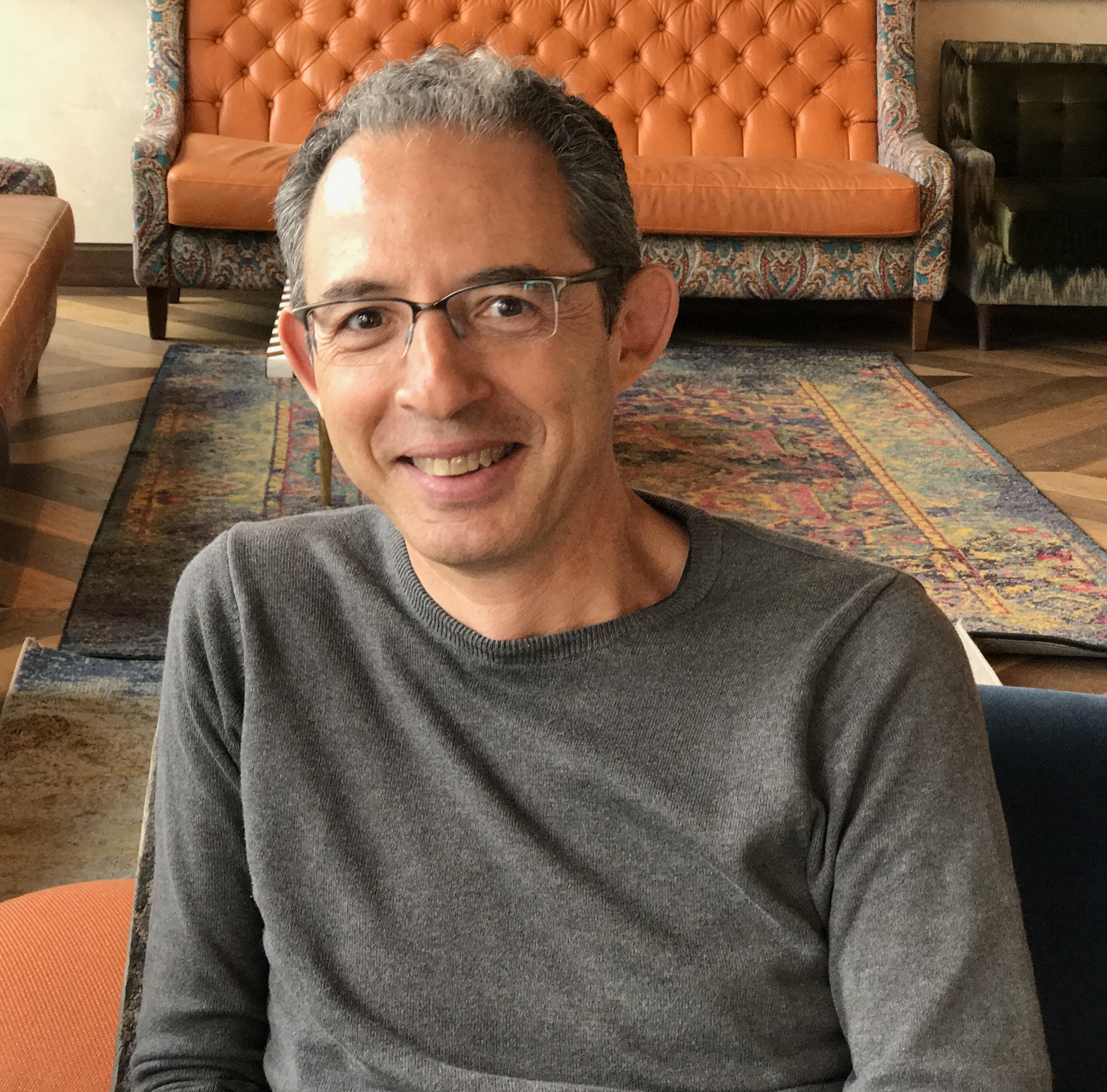
Kamoun in 2017

Kamoun is known for his contributions to understanding plant diseases and plant immunity. He used genomics and molecular biology methods to obtain insights into the biology and evolution of eukaryotic plant pathogens. He discovered virulence effector families from plant pathogens and showed how they can modulate plant immunity. He demonstrated how antagonistic coevolution with host plants has impacted the architecture of pathogen genomes, accelerated the evolution of effector genes, and drove the emergence of immune receptor networks.

After his PhD, Kamoun worked at the National Science Foundation (NSF) Center for Engineering Plants for Resistance Against Pathogens at the University of California, Davis, and at the Department of Phytopathology (Wageningen University, Netherlands). He was on the faculty of the Department of Plant Pathology (Ohio State University, Wooster campus) from 1998 to 2007, before joining The Sainsbury Laboratory in 2007. He served as Head of The Sainsbury Laboratory from 2009 to 2014 and also holds the rank of professor of biology at the University of East Anglia. Kamoun served as president of the International Society for Molecular Plant-Microbe Interactions from 2012-2014.

== Awards and honours ==
Kamoun received several awards and recognitions. He received the 2003 Syngenta Award and the 2013 Noel Keen Award from the American Phytopathological Society, the Daiwa Adrian Prize in 2010, and the Kuwait Prize in 2016. He was elected a member of the Academia Europaea (MAE) in 2011, and the European Molecular Biology Organization (EMBO) in 2015. Kamoun won successive European Research Council (ERC) Advanced Investigator grants in 2011, 2017 and in 2023 under the UK Horizon Europe Guarantee. In 2018, he was elected a Fellow of the Royal Society (FRS) and he received the Linnean Medal for his outstanding contributions to plant science. He has been a Foreign Fellow of the Bangladesh Academy of Sciences since 2022. As of 2025, Kamoun became a co-editor of the Annual Review of Phytopathology.
