= Nick Talbot =

British molecular geneticist (born 1965)

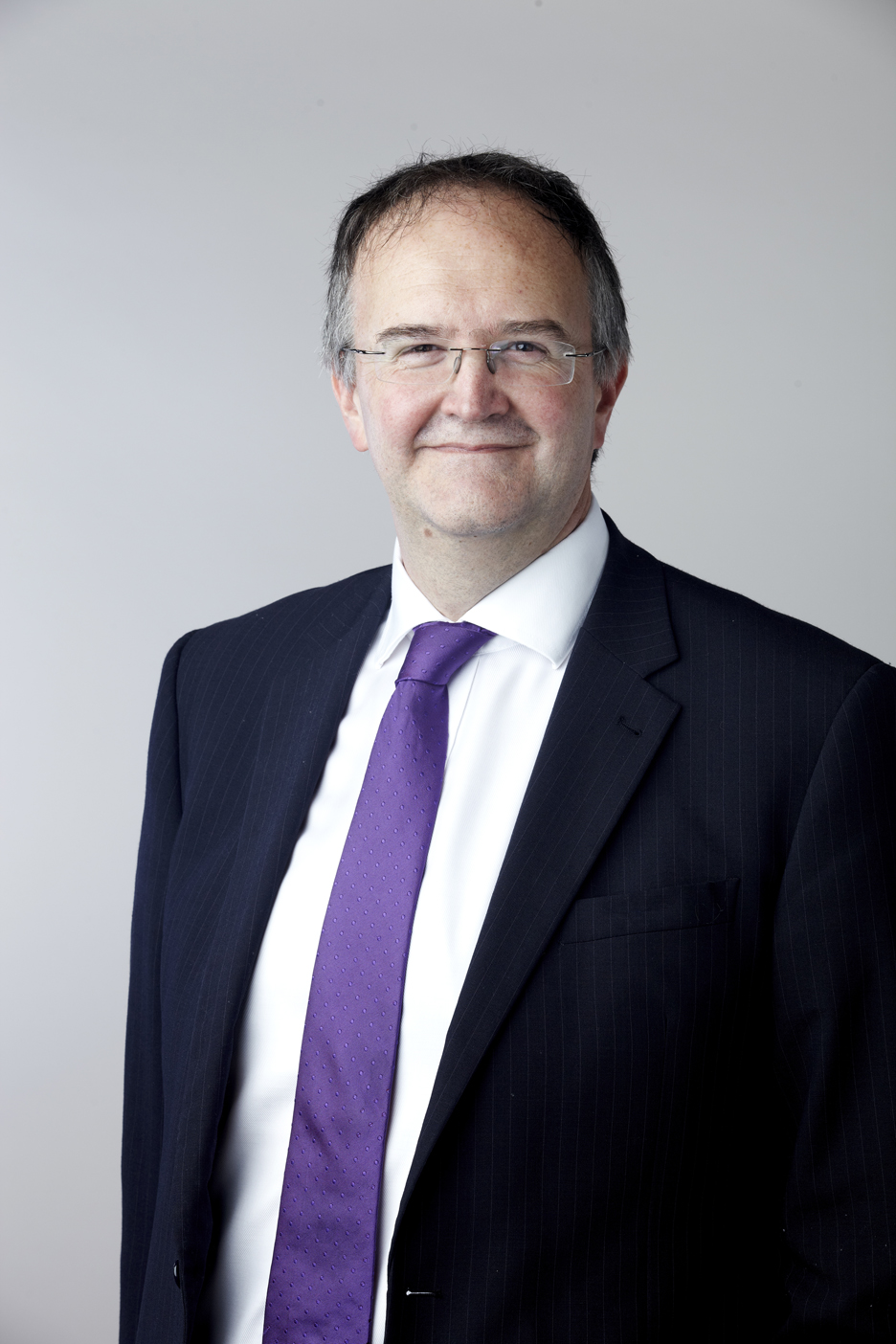
- Nick Talbot at the Royal Society admissions day in London, July 2014
- Born: Nicholas José Talbot; 5 September 1965 (age 60); Haslemere, Surrey, England
- Education: University of Wales, Swansea (BSc); University of East Anglia (PhD)
- Known for: Research on Magnaporthe grisea
- Spouse: Catherine Ann Walsh
- Awards: FRSB (2010); EMBO Member (2013); FRS (2014)
- Scientific career
- Fields: Molecular genetics; Plant pathology; Developmental biology
- Workplaces: Sainsbury Laboratory; University of Exeter; Purdue University
- Thesis: Genetic and genomic analysis of Cladosporuim fulvum (syn. Fulvia fulva) (1990)
- Website: tsl.ac.uk/staff/professor-nick-talbot/

Nicholas José Talbot FRS FRSB (born 5 September 1965) is a British biologist who currently serves as Group Leader and Executive Director at The Sainsbury Laboratory in Norwich.

== Education ==
Talbot was educated at Midhurst Grammar School. He went on to study at the University of Wales, Swansea for a Bachelor of Science degree in microbiology, graduating in 1986. Following his undergraduate degree, he trained at the University of East Anglia (UEA) where he was awarded a PhD in 1990 for genetic and genomic analysis of the leaf mould Cladosporuim fulvum.

== Career ==
After postdoctoral research at Purdue University from 1990 to 1993, Talbot was appointed a Lecturer at the University of Exeter in 1993, and has been Professor of Molecular Genetics since 1999. He was appointed Deputy Vice-Chancellor for Research and Knowledge Transfer in 2010. In 2018, Talbot joined The Sainsbury Laboratory in Norwich as Group Leader and Executive Director.

== Research ==
Talbot's research investigates plant pathology and developmental biology, especially the rice blast fungus Magnaporthe grisea, one of the world's most devastating diseases. Talbot is the editor of Molecular and Cellular Biology of Filamentous Fungi and Plant-Pathogen Interactions.

Talbot's research has been funded by the Biotechnology and Biological Sciences Research Council (BBSRC) and the Engineering and Physical Sciences Research Council (EPSRC). Talbot has twice been awarded prestigious European Research Council (ERC) Advanced Grants in 2013 and 2022. His current ERC grant supports the SEPBLAST project which will build on his research group's recent discoveries on fungal morphogenetic proteins, called septins, being essential for the rice blast pathogen to cause disease.

== Awards and honours ==
Talbot was elected Fellow of the Royal Society of Biology (FRSB) in 2010, a member of the European Molecular Biology Organization in 2013, and a Member of Academia Europaea (MAE) in 2014. He was also elected as a Fellow of the Royal Society (FRS) in 2014. His nomination reads:

Nicholas Talbot is distinguished for his discoveries contributing to our knowledge of how fungi cause disease in plants. He has elucidated the molecular processes of cell differentiation and autophagic cell death in fungi causing diseases such as rice blast. He has shown how these processes are intimately involved in virulence and pathogenicity and are orchestrated to enable the complex cellular processes that enable a filamentous fungus to invade healthy plants. His work is characterised by a combination of molecular, genetic, genomic and cell biological approaches.

In 2025, Talbot was elected as a Fellow of the American Association for the Advancement of Science (AAAS).

== Personal life ==
Talbot is married to Catherine Ann Walsh, with two sons and one daughter.
