= Jeffery Dangl =

American biologist

- Born: October 13, 1957; Redding, California, US
- Education: Stanford University
- Known for: Co-developed the zigzag model of plant immunity
- Awards: Wolf Prize in Agriculture
- Scientific career
- Fields: molecular genetics
- Workplaces: University of North Carolina at Chapel Hill; Howard Hughes Medical Institute
- Doctoral advisor: Leonard Herzenberg

Jeffery Lee Dangl (born October 13, 1957) is an American biologist and geneticist whose research concerns plant immunity, plant–microbe interactions, molecular genetics, and plant-associated microbiomes. He is the John N. Couch Distinguished Professor of Biology at the University of North Carolina at Chapel Hill (UNC) and an investigator of the Howard Hughes Medical Institute. He is a Foreign Member of the Royal Society and an elected member of the National Academy of Sciences, the German National Academy of Sciences Leopoldina, and the American Academy of Microbiology.

Dangl's research has contributed to the molecular understanding of plant innate immunity, including disease-resistance genes, intracellular immune receptors, pathogen effectors, and the interactions between plants and their associated microbial communities. With Jonathan D. G. Jones, he developed the "zigzag model" of plant immunity, a conceptual framework describing the evolutionary interaction between plant immune responses and pathogen virulence mechanisms.

In 2025, Dangl shared the Wolf Prize in Agriculture with Jones and Brian J. Staskawicz for discoveries concerning the immune system and disease resistance in plants.

== Early life and education ==
He grew up in Redding, California. He attended Stanford University, where he received undergraduate degrees in Biological Sciences and Modern Literature in 1981. He received his PhD. from the Stanford University School of Medicine in 1986 under the supervision of Leonard A. Herzenberg. His doctoral research concerned genetically engineered chimeric monoclonal antibodies and somatically selected mouse immunoglobulin heavy-chain genes.

Dangl's early research was in mammalian immunology. His work included studies of mouse immunoglobulin genes and antibody structure. A 1986 paper in Nature, co-authored with researchers from Stanford and other institutions, examined recombination involving an expressed mouse immunoglobulin heavy-chain gene.

Later, he conducted postdoctoral research with Klaus Hahlbrock at the Max Planck Institute for Plant Breeding Research in Cologne, Germany. During this period he shifted his research focus from mammalian immunology to plant molecular biology and plant–pathogen interactions. In 1989, he established an independent research group at the Max Delbrück Laboratory in Cologne.

== Career ==
In 1995, Dangl joined the faculty of the University of North Carolina at Chapel Hill. He holds appointments in the Department of Biology and the Department of Microbiology and Immunology and is a member of the university's genetics and genomics programs. He subsequently became the John N. Couch Distinguished Professor of Biology and, in 2011, an investigator of the Howard Hughes Medical Institute.

Dangl has served on scientific and governmental advisory bodies, including the National Research Council's Board on Life Sciences. He chaired and contributed to National Research Council reviews concerning the National Plant Genome Research Initiative and participated in advisory and review activities for national research agencies.

== Research ==
=== Plant immunity ===
Dangl's research established plant molecular genetics as a major approach to studying innate immunity and plant–pathogen interactions. His laboratory contributed to the development of Arabidopsis thaliana as a model for investigating plant disease resistance and helped identify molecular components involved in pathogen recognition and immune signalling.

A major focus of his research has been plant disease-resistance genes and nucleotide-binding leucine-rich repeat (NLR) proteins. These intracellular immune receptors detect pathogen-derived molecules or changes caused by pathogen effectors and activate defensive responses. Dangl's research has contributed to understanding the molecular mechanisms by which these receptors recognize pathogen activity and initiate immune signalling.

Together with Jonathan D. G. Jones, Dangl developed the zigzag model of plant immunity, introduced in a 2006 Nature review. The model integrates pattern-triggered immunity, pathogen effector-mediated suppression of host defence, and effector-triggered immunity mediated by intracellular immune receptors. It was proposed as a conceptual framework for understanding the coevolution between plant resistance mechanisms and pathogen virulence factors. Subsequent reviews have described the Jones–Dangl zigzag model as a widely used framework for explaining plant–pathogen interactions.

=== Plant microbiomes ===
Later work in the Dangl laboratory expanded from pathogen recognition to the broader community of microorganisms associated with plants. The laboratory pioneered research into the organization and function of plant-associated microbiomes, investigating how plants distinguish beneficial microorganisms from pathogens and how immune signalling influences microbial communities.

In a 2017 Nature study, Dangl and colleagues investigated how root microbiota interact with plant nutrient responses and immunity, finding that the genetic network controlling phosphate stress influenced the composition of the root microbial community.

Dangl subsequently co-authored a 2019 review, Beyond pathogens: microbiota interactions with the plant immune system, which examined interactions between plant immune systems and beneficial or commensal microorganisms.

His laboratory has also contributed to research on the plant microbiome at the level of microbial ecology and molecular mechanisms. A 2020 Annual Review of Microbiology article co-authored by Dangl examined the development of plant microbiome research from ecological studies toward mechanistic and reductionist approaches.

More recent research from the laboratory has examined microbial metabolism and plant-associated bacterial communities, including studies of bacterial auxin catabolism in the plant microbiome.

=== Connections to animal innate immunity ===
Dangl's research on plant immune receptors has also contributed to broader comparisons between plant and animal innate immune systems. Plant NLR proteins share structural and functional characteristics with intracellular immune receptors in animals. Human NOD proteins, for example, belong to a broader family of intracellular immune proteins related to plant disease-resistance proteins.

This relationship became particularly relevant to human disease research after mutations in the human NOD2 gene were associated with susceptibility to Crohn's disease. The discovery established a connection between the molecular architecture of plant disease-resistance proteins and mechanisms of innate immune recognition in animals. Dangl's work on plant resistance genes and immune receptors formed part of the broader scientific context for comparative studies of these immune systems.

The relationship should not be described as Dangl having discovered the genetic cause of Crohn's disease; rather, his research contributed to understanding the plant immune-receptor systems that provided an important comparative framework for subsequent research on related animal innate immune proteins.

== Editorial and advisory work ==
Dangl has served on the editorial boards of several scientific journals. He has served on the editorial boards of Science, Cell, and Proceedings of the National Academy of Sciences, and has held editorial responsibilities for Current Opinion in Plant Biology.

He has also participated in scientific advisory activities outside academia. Dangl is a member of the Scientific Advisory Board of 2Blades, an organization working on plant immunity and crop disease resistance.

== Awards and honours ==
Dangl was elected a member of the American Association for the Advancement of Science in 2004. He was elected to the German National Academy of Sciences Leopoldina in 2003, the National Academy of Sciences in 2007, and the American Academy of Microbiology in 2011.

In 2023, Dangl was elected a Foreign Member of the Royal Society (ForMemRS), the United Kingdom's national academy of sciences.

He has received the Stephen Hales Prize from the American Society of Plant Biologists and an award from the International Society for Molecular Plant-Microbe Interactions for contributions to the understanding of plant–pathogen interactions.

In 2025, Dangl shared the Wolf Prize in Agriculture with Jonathan D. G. Jones and Brian J. Staskawicz.

== Personal life ==
Dangl has a rare form of muscular dystrophy, facioscapulohumeral muscular dystrophy. Dangl is married to biologist Sarah Grant.

== Selected publications ==
- Dangl, Jeffery L.; Jones, Jonathan D. G. (2001). "Plant pathogens and integrated defence responses to infection". Nature. 411: 826–833.
- Jones, Jonathan D. G.; Dangl, Jeffery L. (2006). "The plant immune system". Nature. 444: 323–329.
- Eitas, Timothy K.; Dangl, Jeffery L. (2010). "NB-LRR proteins: pairs, pieces, perception, partners, and pathways". Current Opinion in Plant Biology. 13 (4): 472–477.
- Dangl, Jeffery L.; Horvath, Diana M.; Staskawicz, Brian J. (2013). "Pivoting the plant immune system from dissection to deployment". Science. 341 (6147): 746–751.
- Teixeira, Paulo J. P. L.; Colaianni, Nicholas R.; Fitzpatrick, Connor R.; Dangl, Jeffery L. (2019). "Beyond pathogens: microbiota interactions with the plant immune system". Current Opinion in Microbiology. 49: 7–17.
- Fitzpatrick, Connor R.; Salas-González, Isai; Conway, Jonathan M.; et al., including Dangl, Jeffery L. (2020). "The Plant Microbiome: From Ecology to Reductionism and Beyond". Annual Review of Microbiology. 74.
