= Jane Parker =

Jane Parker may refer to:

- Jane Porter (Tarzan), named Jane Parker in the film Tarzan the Ape Man
- Jane Boleyn, Viscountess Rochford (c. 1505–1542), born Jane Parker, sister-in-law of Anne Boleyn
- Jane E. Parker (born 1960), British botanist
- Jane Marsh Parker, American author and historian
- Jane Parker, a former private brand of The Great Atlantic & Pacific Tea Company now made by another company
