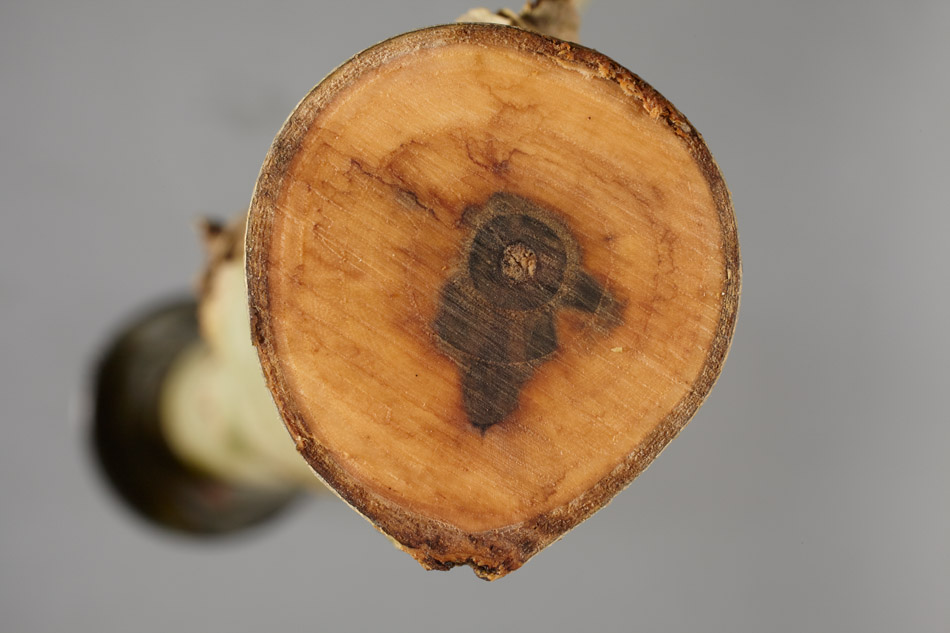

Scientific classification
- Kingdom: Fungi
- Division: Ascomycota
- Class: Leotiomycetes
- Order: Helotiales
- Family: Helotiaceae
- Genus: Hymenoscyphus
- Species: H. fraxineus

Binomial name
- Hymenoscyphus fraxineus Baral et al. (2014)

Synonyms
- Chalara fraxinea (Kowalski et al., 2006); Hymenoscyphus pseudoalbidus (Queloz et al., 2011)

= Hymenoscyphus fraxineus =

Fungus, cause of ash dieback

Hymenoscyphus fraxineus is an ascomycete fungus that causes ash dieback, a chronic fungal disease of ash trees in Europe characterised by leaf loss and crown dieback in infected trees. The fungus was first scientifically described in 2006 under the name Chalara fraxinea. Four years later it was discovered that Chalara fraxinea is the asexual (anamorphic) stage of a fungus that was subsequently named Hymenoscyphus pseudoalbidus and then renamed as Hymenoscyphus fraxineus.

The first recognised report of this disease was in 1992 after a large number of ash trees had died in Poland. The disease is now widespread in Europe, with up to 85% mortality rates recorded in plantations and 69% in woodlands. It is closely related to a native fungus Hymenoscyphus albidus, which is harmless to European ash trees. A 2016 report published in the Journal of Ecology posited that a combination of H. fraxineus and emerald ash borer attacks could result in the extinction of European ash trees.

== Genetics ==
The fungus Hymenoscyphus fraxineus was first identified and described in 2006 under the name Chalara fraxinea. In 2009, based on morphological and DNA sequence comparisons, Chalara fraxinea was suggested to be the asexual stage (anamorph) of the ascomycete fungus Hymenoscyphus albidus. However, Hymenoscyphus albidus has been known from Europe since 1851 and is not regarded as pathogenic. In 2010, through molecular genetic methods, the sexual stage (teleomorph) of the fungus was recognized as a new species and named Hymenoscyphus pseudoalbidus. Four years later it was determined that "under the rules for the naming of fungi with pleomorphic life-cycles", the correct name should be Hymenoscyphus fraxineus. Hymenoscyphus fraxineus is "morphologically virtually identical" to Hymenoscyphus albidus, but there are notable genetic differences between the two species.

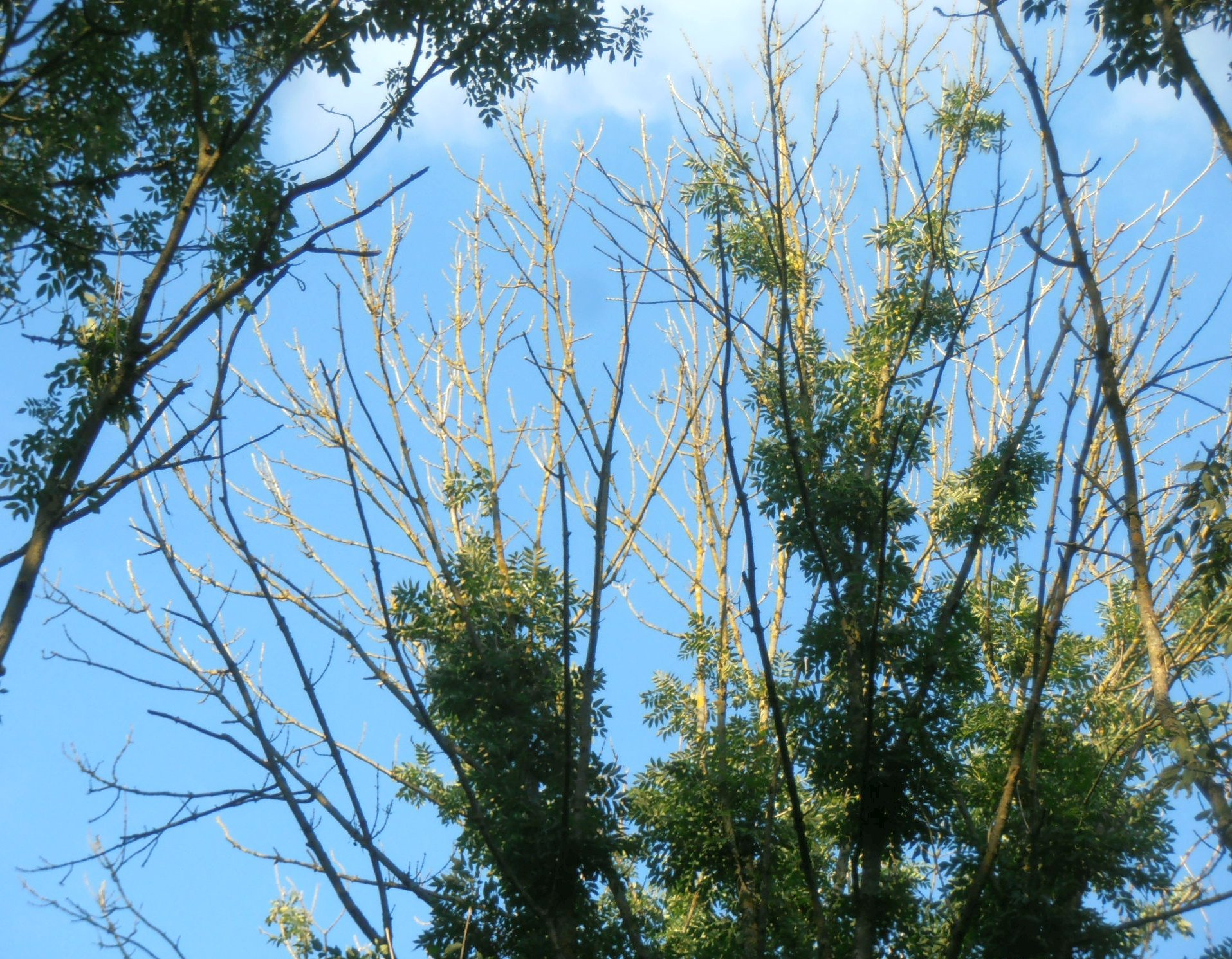
Crown dieback in a mature ash tree

The lifecycle of Hymenoscyphus fraxineus comprises two phases: sexual and asexual. The asexual stage (anamorph) grows in affected trees attacking the bark and encircling twigs and branches. The sexual, reproductive stage, (teleomorph) grows during summer on ash petioles in the previous year's fallen leaves. The ascospores are produced in asci and are transmitted by wind, which may explain the rapid spread of the fungus. The origins of the disease are uncertain, but researchers are investigating the theory that the fungus originated in Asia, where ash trees are immune to the disease. Genetic analysis of the fungus Lambertella albida which grows harmlessly on petioles of the Manchurian ash (Fraxinus mandschurica) in Japan, has shown that it is likely to be the same species as Hymenoscyphus fraxineus.

In December 2012, teams from The Sainsbury Laboratory (TSL) and the John Innes Centre in Norwich sequenced the genome of the fungus. The sequence has been published on the website OpenAshDieBack and offers insights into the mechanisms of infection in trees by the fungus. The study identified toxin genes and other genes that may be responsible for the virulence of the fungus. In the long term researchers aim to find the genes that confer resistance to the pathogen in some ash trees.

== Ash dieback ==
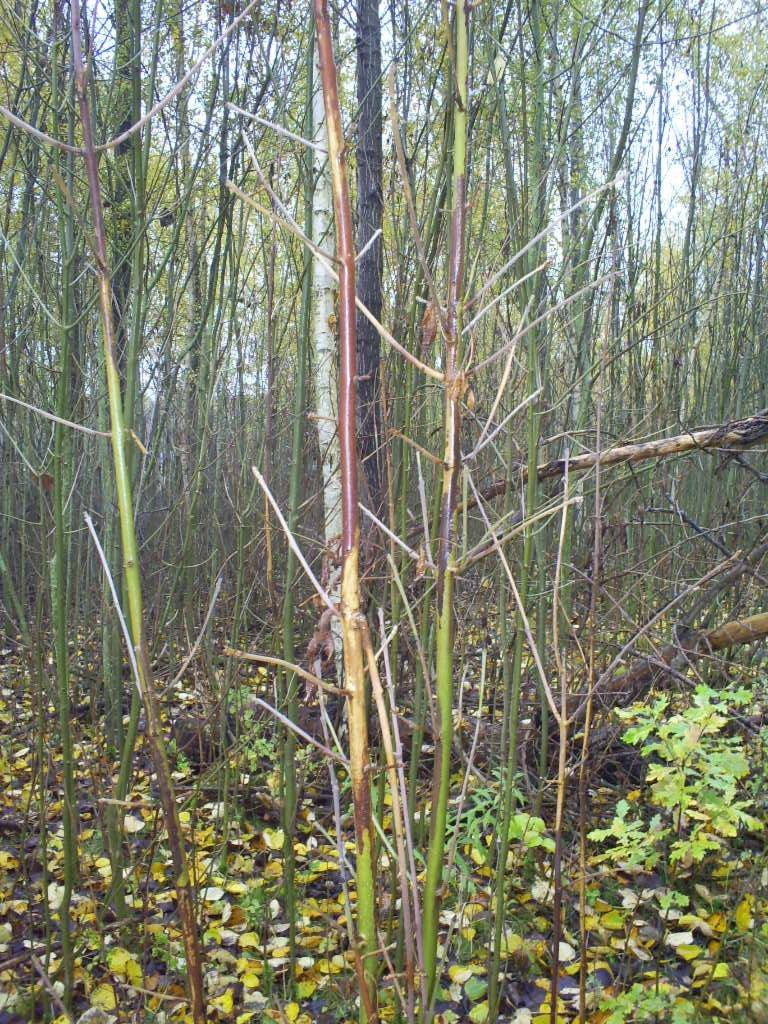
Yellow to red-brown necrosis in a five-year-old ash tree

Trees now believed to have been infected with this pathogen were reported dying in large numbers in Poland in 1992. By the mid 1990s, the fungus had also been identified in Lithuania, Latvia and Estonia. However, it was not until 2006 that the fungus's asexual stage, Chalara fraxinea, was first described by scientists, and 2010 before its sexual stage was described. By 2008, the disease had also been discovered in Scandinavia, the Czech Republic, Slovenia, Germany, Austria and Switzerland. By 2012, it had spread to Belgium, France, Hungary, Italy, Luxembourg, the Netherlands, Romania, Russia, Britain and Ireland. By 2016, it was already identified in central Norway, the northernmost distribution area of the ash tree.

Up to 85% mortality rates due to H. fraxineus have been recorded in plantations and 69% in woodlands. The disease has caused a large-scale decline of ash trees across Poland, with evidence suggesting that in the long term "15 to 20 per cent of trees may survive without exhibiting symptoms." In 2012, it was reported that the disease was reaching its peak in Sweden and Denmark, and that it was entering a post-decline (or chronic) phase in Latvia and Lithuania. The disease was first observed in Denmark in 2002, and had spread throughout the country by 2005. In 2009 it was estimated that 50 per cent of Denmark's ash trees were affected by crown dieback, and a 2010 estimate stated that 60–90% of ash trees in Denmark were affected and may eventually disappear. The disease was first reported in Sweden in 2003. A survey conducted in Götaland in 2009 found that more than 50% of the trees had noticeable thinning and 25% were severely injured.

A Danish study found that substantial genetic variation between ash trees resulted in significant differences in their susceptibility to the disease. However, the proportion of trees with a high level of natural resistance seemed to be very low, probably less than 5%. A Lithuanian trial based on the planting of trees derived from both Lithuanian and foreign populations of European ash found 10% of trees survived in all progeny trials to the age of eight years. Mass screening trials in Britain found that less than 5% of trees were healthy after three years. Subsequent genetic analysis of these trials found a highly polygenic basis to ash dieback resistance, and allowed genomic prediction models for tree health to be trained. Use of these genomic prediction models on adult and juvenile trees in a woodland in Surrey, England, gave evidence that natural selection is acting to increase resistance to ash dieback in ash populations.

So far the fungus has mainly affected the European ash (Fraxinus excelsior) and its cultivars, but it is also known to attack the narrow-leafed ash (Fraxinus angustifolia). The manna ash (Fraxinus ornus) is also a known host, although it is less susceptible than the other European ash species. Experiments in Estonia have shown that several North American ash species are susceptible, especially the black ash (Fraxinus nigra), and to a lesser extent the green ash (Fraxinus pennsylvanica). The white ash (Fraxinus americana) and the Asian species known as Manchurian ash (Fraxinus mandschurica) showed only minor symptoms in the study.

=== Symptoms and colonisation strategies ===
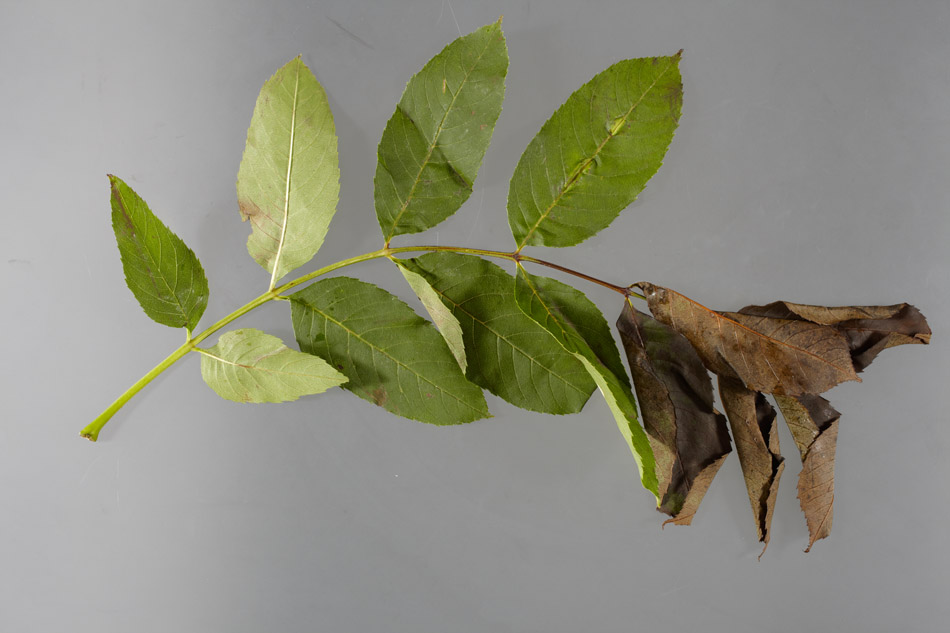
Wilting of leaves caused by necrosis of the rachis (stem)

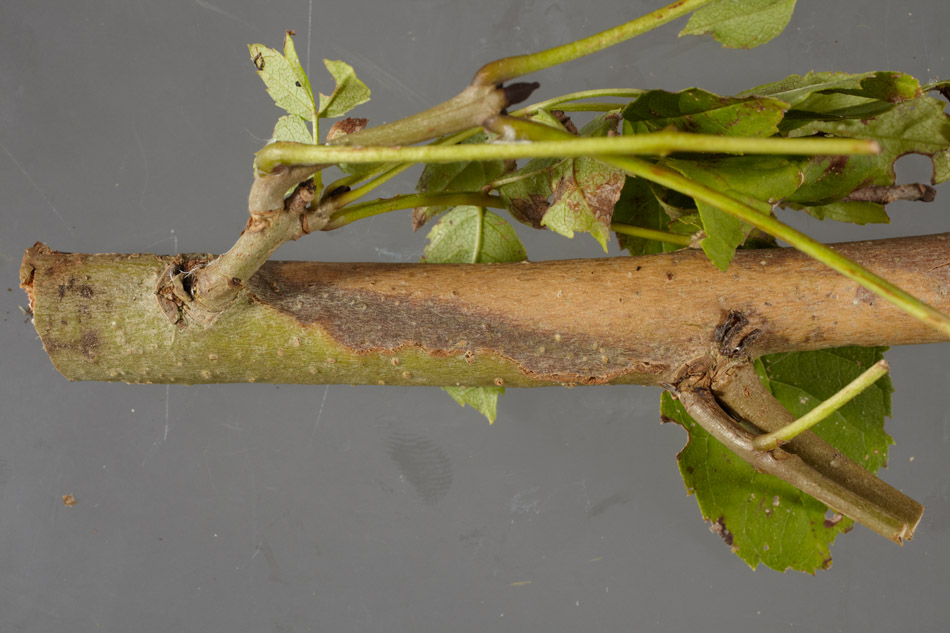
Small lens-shaped lesion on the bark of stem

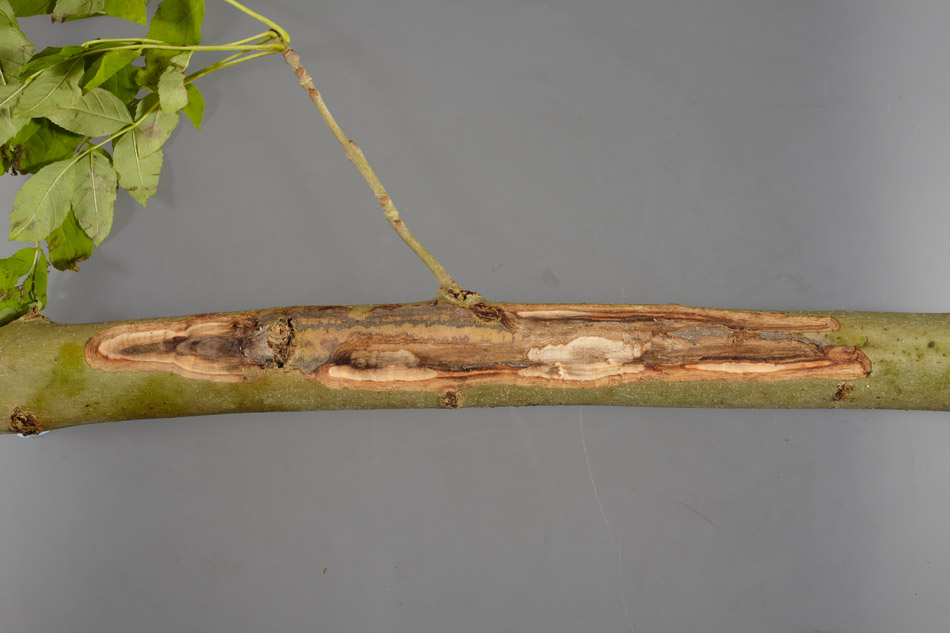
Large lesion extending along a branch

Initially, small necrotic spots (without exudate) appear on stems and branches. These necrotic lesions then enlarge in stretched, perennial cankers on the branches, wilting, premature shedding of leaves and particularly in the death of the top of the crown. Below the bark, necrotic lesions frequently extend to the xylem, especially in the axial and paratracheal ray tissue. The mycelium can pass through the simple pits, perforating the middle lamella but damage to either the plasmalemma or cell walls was not observed. The disease is often chronic but can be lethal. It is particularly destructive to young ash plants, killing them within one growing season of the initial symptoms becoming visible. Older trees can survive initial attacks, but tend to succumb eventually after several seasons of infection.

=== Management ===
There are currently no effective strategies for managing the disease, and most countries which have tried to control its spread have been unsuccessful. The removal of trees in infected areas has little effect as the fungus lives and grows on leaf litter on the forest floor. Research at the Swedish University of Agricultural Sciences suggests that the deliberate destruction of trees in an infected area can be counterproductive as it destroys the few resistant trees alongside the dying ones. One approach to managing the disease may be to take branches from resistant trees and graft them to rootstock to produce seeds of resistant trees in a controlled environment. A Lithuanian trial aimed at identifying disease-resistant trees has resulted in the selection of fifty such trees for the establishment of breeding populations of European ash in different provinces of Lithuania. A breeding programme for resistant trees is a viable strategy but the process of restoring the ash tree population across Europe with resistant trees is likely to take decades.

=== Ash dieback in the United Kingdom ===
The fungus was first detected in Britain during February 2012 at sites that had received saplings from nurseries within the preceding five years. A ban on imports of ash from other European countries was imposed in October 2012 after infected trees were found in established woodland. On 29 October Environment minister David Heath confirmed that 100,000 nursery trees and saplings had been deliberately destroyed. The government also banned ash imports, but experts described this measure as "too little too late". The UK Government Emergency Committee COBR convened on 2 November to address the crisis. A survey of Scottish trees started in November 2012. A 2020 study suggested that certain landscapes with hedgerows and woods made up of different types of tree resisted the disease better than areas mainly populated with ash trees.

==== Government and Forestry Commission guidance ====
The Forestry Commission has produced guidance and requested people report possible cases.

Comparisons have been made to the outbreak of Dutch elm disease in the 1960s and 1970s. In 2012 it was estimated that up to 99% of the 90 million ash trees in the UK would be killed by the disease.

On 9 November 2012 the United Kingdom Government presented its strategy. Environment Secretary Owen Paterson announced that the disease was acknowledged to be a long-term presence in the UK, and that efforts would be concentrated on slowing its spread. Young and newly planted trees with the disease would be destroyed; however, mature trees would not be removed due to the implications for wildlife that depends on the trees for their natural habitat. The strategy unveiled by Paterson included:

- Reducing the rate of spread of the disease
- Developing resistance to the disease in the native UK ash tree population
- Encouraging the public and landowners to help monitor trees for signs of ash dieback.

In March 2013 Owen Paterson announced that the United Kingdom Government would plant a quarter of a million ash trees in an attempt to identify strains of the species that are resistant to the fungus.

In February 2016 the BBC program "Countryfile" presented a case study of enhanced resistance to ash dieback following soil treatment by injecting enriched "Biochar" - a type of charcoal. Over a three-year period, twenty trees had remained free of disease despite a severe infestation of the surrounding trees.

In December 2016, writing in Nature, Dr Richard Buggs reported that the common ash (Fraxinus excelsior) had been genetically sequenced for the first time and UK specimens appeared more resistant than Danish ones.

In August 2018 Defra and the Forestry Commission announced that at Westonbirt Arboretum the fungus had been found infecting three new hosts: Phillyrea latifolia (mock privet), Phillyrea angustifolia (narrow-leaved mock privet) and Chionanthus virginicus (white fringetree). These were the first findings on hosts other than Fraxinus anywhere in the world. All three new hosts are in the same taxonomic family as ash, the Oleaceae. The trees were all in the vicinity of infected European ash. In response to the findings on the new hosts, Nicola Spence, the UK Chief Plant Health Office, said that, "Landscapers, gardeners and tree practitioners should be vigilant for signs of ash dieback on these new host species, and report suspicious findings through Tree Alert".

In June 2019, Defra published a report summarising the current state of knowledge regarding ash dieback, and identified priority areas for future research. In 2019 and 2020, the UK government and Future Trees Trust planted 3,000 ash trees in Hampshire to establish the Ash Archive. All the trees came from shoots of trees that demonstrated resistance to the fungus. The Ash Archive will form the basis of a breeding program.

=== Ash dieback in Ireland ===
On 12 October 2012 the Department of Agriculture, Food and the Marine confirmed the first recorded instance of the fungus in Ireland, at a plantation in County Leitrim. Legislation was introduced in both Northern Ireland and the Republic of Ireland on 26 October banning the importation and movement of ash plants from infected parts of Europe. By 23 September 2013, a survey conducted by the Irish Government revealed that the disease had been identified at ninety-six sites across the Republic of Ireland. As of August 2021, Teagasc warns that: "The disease is now prevalent throughout most of the island of Ireland and is likely to cause the death of the majority of the ash trees over the next two decades."

The first cases in Northern Ireland were confirmed at five sites in counties Down and Antrim on 16 November 2012. By 4 December 2012 the disease had been confirmed at sixteen sites in counties Down, Antrim, Tyrone and Londonderry.

=== Wider ecological knockon effects ===
Due to the importance of F. excelsior as a host, Jönsson and Thor 2012 find that H. fraxineus is subjecting rare/threatened lichens to an unusually high (0.38) coextinction risk probability vis-a-vis the host tree in the wooded meadows of Gotland, Sweden. Studies detected no signs of ash mortality compensation by the surviving trees, particularly in mixed forests, indicating a mid-term habitat loss and niche replacement of ash.

== See also ==
- Forest pathology
