= Kamounia (genus) =

Kamounia Temporal range: late Carboniferous 307–303 Ma

Scientific classification
- Domain: Eukaryota
- Clade: Sar
- Clade: Stramenopiles
- Phylum: Oomycota
- Class: Peronosporomycetes (?)
- Genus: †Kamounia; Strullu-Derrien et al., 2026
- Species: †K. striata

Binomial name
- †Kamounia striata Strullu-Derrien et al., 2026

Extinct genus of saprotrophic oomycete

Kamounia is an extinct Oomycete from the late Carboniferous of France. It is known to have been saprotrophic organism, meaning it fed on decaying matter, and also adds to the sparse fossil record of oomycetes. It is a monotypic genus, containing only Kamounia striata.

== Discovery and naming ==
The holotype material for Kamounia was found in the Grand’Croix Chert, Massif Central of France, and was formally described and named in 2026.

The generic name Kamounia is in honour of Sophien Kamoun, due to his pioneering genomics and molecular biology methods on oomycetes and fungi. The specific name striata directly derives from the Latin word of the same spelling, striata, to mean "furrowed, grooved", in reference to the ornamentation seen on the oogonium.

== Description ==
Kamounia striata is globose oomycete, with a small sporangia reaching up to 13.5 μm (0.00053 in) in diameter, with small extensions up to 2 μm (7.9×10^{−5} in) in length. It also bears thick-ridged oogonia, which can get up to 17.5 μm (0.00069 in) in diameter, and oospore are also preserved, getting up to 8 μm (0.00031 in) in diameter. Preserved hyphae are on average 2 μm (7.9×10^{−5} in) in length, although can get up to 5 μm (0.00020 in) on antheridiums.

Due to the preservation of the fossils, it is currently unknown whether its due to them being immature specimens, the result of taphonomic loss, or ecological factors due to their saprotrophic lifestyle.
