= Jane E. Parker =

British scientist

Jane Parker
- Born: 1960 (age 65–66)
- Website: www.mpipz.mpg.de/23590/curriculum_vitae
- Scientific career
- Fields: Botany
- Thesis: Developmental regulation of protein synthesis in Euglena gracilis (1987)

Jane Elizabeth Parker FRS (born 1960) is a British scientist who researches the immune responses of plants at the Max Planck Institute for Plant Breeding Research.

== Education and early life ==
Jane Elizabeth Parker was born in 1960 in Great Britain and completed her undergraduate degree at the University of Bradford in applied Biology in 1983. She went on to earn her PhD in 1986 from Swansea University on protein synthesis in Euglena.

== Career and research ==
Following her PhD, she was a postdoctoral researcher at the Max Planck Institute for Plant Breeding Research. Throughout the 1990s, she worked at the Sainsbury Laboratory at the John Innes Centre in the Norwich Research Park, at Norwich, England, but left in August 2001, with her husband, Dr. George Coupland to take up a post as an independent researcher at Cologne's Max Planck Institute.

In 2002, Parker was awarded a Sofia Kovalevskaya Award to continue her research into plant immune responses. She researches how plants defend themselves from disease-causing microorganisms. Her work involves isolating the genes which trigger innate defence mechanisms and combines genetics with molecular biology to evaluate how plants are able to avoid disease. Her research has discovered that there are multiple layers of defence but that a protein, called EDS1, which combines with other proteins to form complexes, is the initial trigger. The immune response varies depending on whether the complex formed is developed from combining with the protein PAD4 or SAG101 to initiate the response to disease resistance.

Since 2009, Parker has been an associate professor at the Institute of Genetics University of Cologne in Germany. In 2013, she was elected a member of the Academy of Sciences Leopoldina, and in 2023 she was elected an international member of the National Academy of Sciences. She is widely published and has been listed on the annual ISI Web of Knowledge most highly cited scientists for 2015, as published by Thomson Reuters.

=== Selected publications ===
The following were noted as the five most important works by Parker, according to Cluster of Excellence on Plant Sciences, a German scientific research organisation group:

- Parker, Jane E; Alcázar, Rubén; García, Ana V; Reymond, Matthieu (19 November 2008). "Incremental steps toward incompatibility revealed by Arabidopsis epistatic interactions modulating salicylic acid pathway activation". Proceedings of the National Academy of Sciences of the United States of America. 106 (1). The National Academy of Sciences: 334–339. doi:10.1073/pnas.0811734106. PMC 2629243. PMID 19106299.
- Parker, Jane E; Alcázar, Rubén; García, Ana V; Kronholm, I; de Meaux, J; Koornneef, M; Reymond, Matthieu (December 2010). "Natural variation at Strubbelig Receptor Kinase 3 drives immune-triggered incompatibilities between Arabidopsis thaliana accessions". Nature Genetics. 42 (12). US National Library of Medicine National Institutes of Health: 1135–1139. doi:10.1038/ng.704. PMID 21037570. S2CID 9595848.
- Parker, Jane E; Stuttmann, J; Hubberten, H.M.; Rietz, S; Kaur, J; Muskett, P; Guerois, R; Bednarek, P; Hoefgen, R (July 2011). "Perturbation of Arabidopsis amino acid metabolism causes incompatibility with the adapted biotrophic pathogen Hyaloperonospora arabidopsidis". Plant Cell. 23 (7). American Society of Plant Biologists: 2788–2803. Bibcode:2011PlanC..23.2788S. doi:10.1105/tpc.111.087684. PMC 3226217. PMID 21784950.
- Parker, Jane E; Heidrich, Katharina; Wirthmueller, Lennart; Tasset, Céline; Pouzet, Cécile; Deslandes, Laurent (9 December 2011). "Arabidopsis EDS1 Connects Pathogen Effector Recognition to Cell Compartment–Specific Immune Responses". Science. 334 (6061). American Association for the Advancement of Science: 1401–1404. Bibcode:2011Sci...334.1401H. doi:10.1126/science.1211641. PMID 22158818. S2CID 206536573.
- Parker, Jane E; Shin, Jieun; Heidrich, Katharina; Sanchez-Villarreal, Alfredo; Davis, Seth J (June 2012). "Time for Coffee Represses Accumulation of the MYC2 Transcription Factor to Provide Time-of-Day Regulation of Jasmonate Signaling in Arabidopsis". Plant Cell. 24 (6). American Society of Plant Biologists: 2470–2482. Bibcode:2012PlanC..24.2470S. doi:10.1105/tpc.111.095430. PMC 3406923. PMID 22693280.

== Awards and honours ==
She is listed on Thomson Reuters' list of the annual ISI Web of Knowledge most highly cited scientists for 2015. She was elected a member of the European Molecular Biology Organization in 2016 and a Fellow of the Royal Society in 2023.
