= Liam Dolan =

British botanist

Liam Dolan FRS
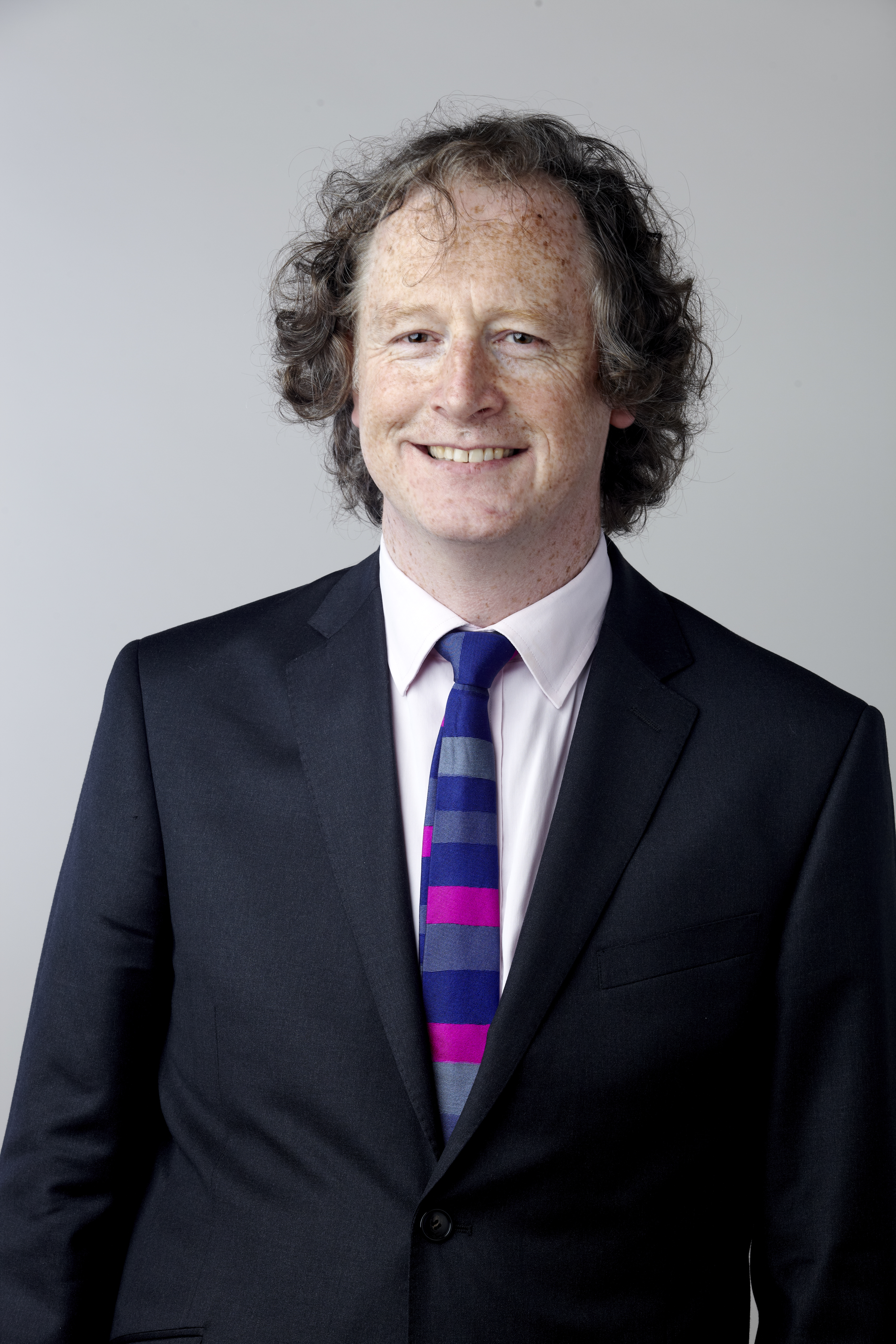
- Liam Dolan at the Royal Society admissions day in London, 2014
- Education: University College Dublin (BSc); University of Pennsylvania (PhD)
- Awards: EMBO Member (2009)
- Scientific career
- Fields: Plant development Plant evolution
- Workplaces: Gregor Mendel Institute; John Innes Centre; University of Oxford
- Thesis: A genetic analysis of leaf development in cotton (Gossypium barbadense L.) (1991)
- Doctoral advisor: R. Scott Poethig
- Website: www.oeaw.ac.at/gmi/research/research-groups/liam-dolan

Liam Dolan FRS is a senior group leader at the Gregor Mendel Institute of the Austrian Academy of Sciences. He previously served as Sherardian Professor of Botany in the Department of Biology at the University of Oxford and a Fellow of Magdalen College, Oxford from 2009 to 2021.

== Education ==
Dolan was educated at University College Dublin and the University of Pennsylvania where he was awarded a PhD in 1991 for genetic analysis of leaf development in the cotton plant Gossypium barbadense supervised by Scott Poethig.

== Career and research ==
Following his PhD, Dolan spent three years doing postdoctoral research at the John Innes Centre in Norwich. After 13 years as an independent project leader in Norwich, Dolan moved to Oxford as the Sherardian Professor of Botany in 2009 to 2021.

Dolan's research aims to define genetic mechanisms that control the development of plants and determine how these mechanisms have changed since plants colonised the land 500 million years ago. Dolan's research has been funded by the Biotechnology and Biological Sciences Research Council (BBSRC) and the Natural Environment Research Council (NERC).

Dolan has made outstanding contributions to the understanding of the development and evolution of land plant rooting systems. He was the first to define the precise cellular body plan of the Arabidopsis root and discovered the molecular genetic mechanism governing root hair cell differentiation. He demonstrated that this mechanism is ancient and was the first to discover the mechanism that controlled the development of the earliest land plant rooting systems that caused dramatic climate change over 400 million years ago. These pivotal discoveries illuminate the interrelationships between the development of plants, their evolution and the Earth System.

With Alison Mary Smith, George Coupland, Nicholas Harberd, Jonathan D. G. Jones, Cathie Martin, Robert Sablowski and Abigail Amey he is a co-author of the textbook Plant Biology.

=== Awards and honours ===
Dolan was elected a Fellow of the Royal Society (FRS) in 2014. Dolan was elected a member of the European Molecular Biology Organization (EMBO) in 2009, and was awarded the President's Medal of the Society for Experimental Biology (SEB) in 2001. In 2024, Dolan was elected a member of the Austrian Academy of Sciences
