= Caroline Dean =

British botanist

Dame Caroline Dean DBE FRS
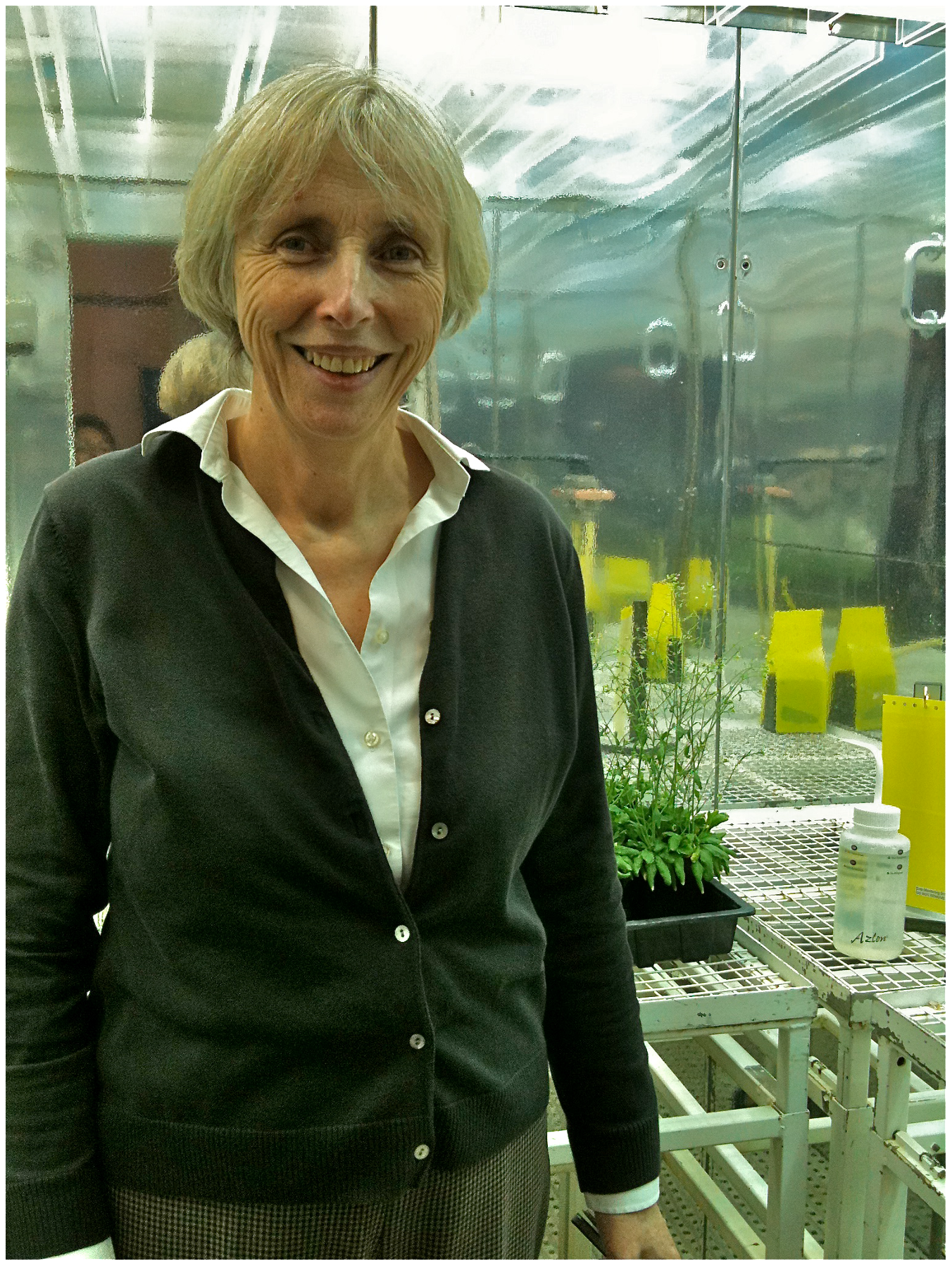
- Born: Caroline Dean; 2 April 1957 (age 69)
- Education: University of York (BA, DPhil)
- Known for: Work on the molecular control of flowering and vernalization in Arabidopsis thaliana
- Spouse: Jonathan Jones (m. 1991)
- Children: one son, one daughter
- Awards: Wolf Prize in Agriculture (2020); L'Oréal-UNESCO For Women in Science Awards (2018); Darwin Medal (2016); Foreign Member of the National Academy of Sciences (2001); EMBO Membership (1999)
- Scientific career
- Fields: Plant Sciences; Molecular biology; Epigenetics
- Workplaces: John Innes Centre; University of York
- Thesis: Investigations of genome expression in young wheat leaves (1983)
- Website: www.jic.ac.uk/people/caroline-dean

Dame Caroline Dean DBE FRS (born 2 April 1957) is a British plant scientist working at the John Innes Centre. She is focused on understanding the molecular controls used by plants to seasonally judge when to flower. She is specifically interested in vernalisation — the acceleration of flowering in plants by exposure to periods of prolonged cold. She has also served on the Life Sciences jury for the Infosys Prize from 2018.

== Education ==
Dean was educated at the University of York, where she was awarded a Bachelor of Arts degree in Biology in 1978 and a PhD in Biology in 1982.

== Research and career ==
Dean's research has been funded by the Biotechnology and Biological Sciences Research Council (BBSRC) European Research Council (ERC), EU-Marie Curie and EMBO and focuses on research on gene regulation and the intersection of chromatin, transcription and non-coding RNAs. Her goal is to understand the chromatin dynamics that enable switching between epigenetic states and quantitative regulation of gene expression. This mechanistic analysis is focused on one gene encoding the floral repressor Flowering Locus C: FLC. Epigenetic switching and quantitative regulation of FLC play a central role in seasonal timing in plants. This acceleration of flowering by prolonged cold is a classic epigenetic process called vernalisation.

FLC regulation involves an antisense-mediated chromatin mechanism that coordinately influences transcription initiation and elongation. As plants overwinter, FLC expression is then epigenetically silenced through a cold-induced, cis-based, polycomb switching mechanism. The group are mechanistically dissecting these conserved chromatin mechanisms and investigating how they have been modulated during adaptation.

She uses Arabidopsis as a reference to establish the regulatory hierarchy and then use this information to translate into other species. She was a pioneer in Arabidopsis becoming a key model organism in plant science.

=== Awards and honours ===
Her nomination for the Royal Society reads:

Dean has made outstanding contributions in the study of developmental timing in plants. Her work has revealed the mechanism by which plants remember they have experienced winter, demonstrated novel RNA processing mechanisms controlling flowering and determined the molecular basis of natural variation in Arabidopsis flowering time. Her discoveries have broad significance in the fields of epigenetics, post-transcriptional regulation and molecular evolution. Dean has also made a massive contribution to the development of Arabidopsis as a model, establishing resources for genetic mapping and insertional mutagenesis, and providing physical maps that underpinned the sequencing of the genome.

Other awards include:

- 1993 – 2002 Honorary Research Fellow, School of Biological Sciences, University of East Anglia
- 1999 – Elected a member of the European Molecular Biology Organization (EMBO)
- 2004 – Appointed Dame Commander of the Order of the British Empire (DBE)
- 2004 – Elected a Fellow of the Royal Society (FRS)
- 2007 – Awarded the Genetics Society Medal
- 2008 – the United States National Academy of Sciences elected her a foreign member
- 2008 – elected a member of the German National Academy of Sciences Leopoldina
- 2015 – Federation of European Biochemical Societies (FEBS)/European Molecular Biology Organization (EMBO) Women in Science Award
- 2016 – Appointed Dame Commander of the Order of the British Empire (DBE) in the 2016 Birthday Honours for services to plant science research and women in science.
- 2016 – Dean was awarded with the Darwin Medal by the Royal Society for her work addressing fundamental questions in the perception of temperature cues and how modifications in epigenetic mechanisms play an important role in adaptation.
- 2018 – Awarded the L'Oréal-UNESCO For Women in Science Award
- 2020 – Received the Wolf Prize in Agriculture.
- 2020 – Awarded the Royal Medal by the Royal Society
- 2023 – Awarded the Mendel Medal by The Genetics Society

== Personal life ==
Dean married to Jonathan D. G. Jones in 1991 and has one son and one daughter.
