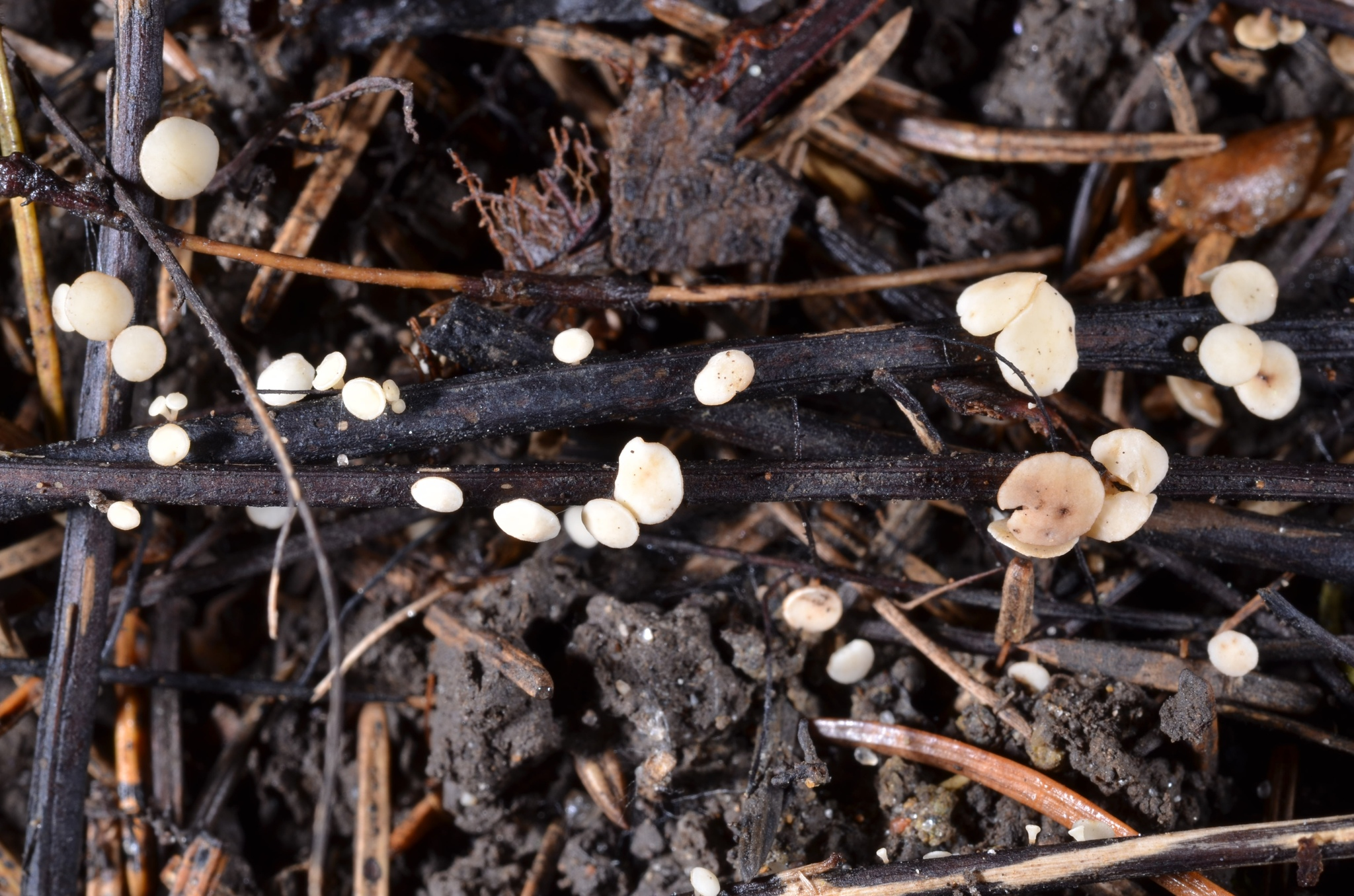

Scientific classification
- Kingdom: Fungi
- Division: Ascomycota
- Class: Leotiomycetes
- Order: Helotiales
- Family: Helotiaceae
- Genus: Hymenoscyphus
- Species: H. albidus

Binomial name
- Hymenoscyphus albidus (Roberge ex Desm.) W. Phillips

= Hymenoscyphus albidus =

Species of fungus

Hymenoscyphus albidus is a saprotrophic fungus which grows on the dead leaves of ash trees.

Hymenoscyphus albidus has been known from Europe since 1851 and is not regarded as pathogenic. It is distinct from, but closely resembles, the pathogenic fungus Hymenoscyphus fraxineus (formerly known as Hymenoscyphus pseudoalbidus). Although Hymenoscyphus albidus is "morphologically virtually identical" to Hymenoscyphus fraxineus, there are substantial genetic differences between the two species.
