= Alison Mary Smith =

British biologist (born 1954)

Alison Smith OBE FRS
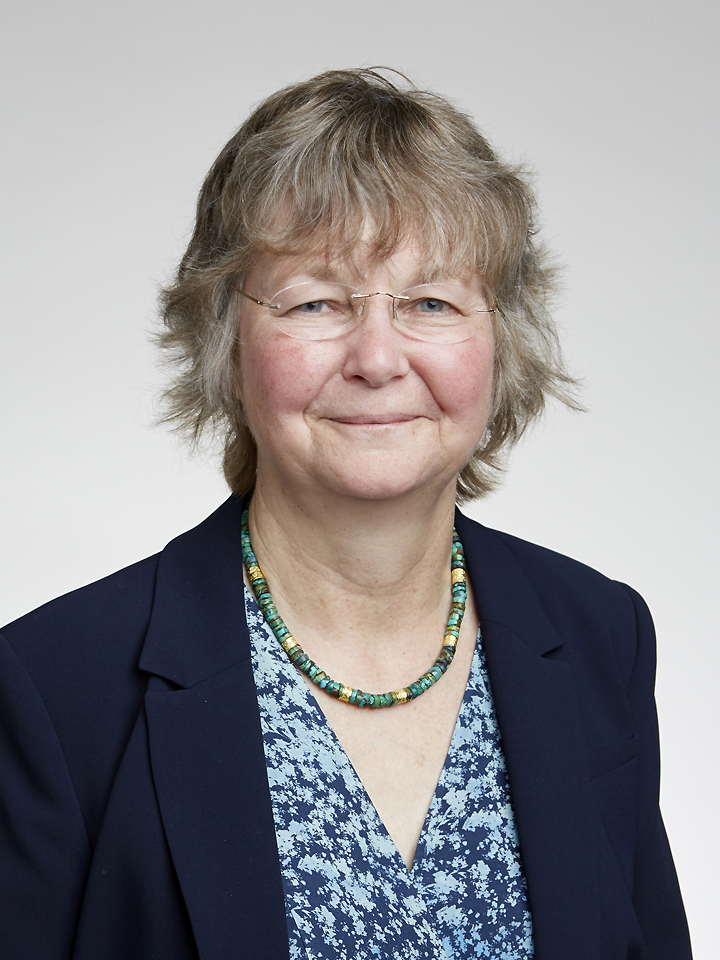
- Smith in 2016
- Born: 1954 (age 71–72)
- Education: University of Cambridge (PhD)
- Awards: OBE (2006); FRS (2016)
- Scientific career
- Workplaces: John Innes Centre; University of East Anglia
- Thesis: Effect of anaerobiosis on plant metabolism (1978)
- Website: www.jic.ac.uk/people/alison-smith/

Alison Mary Smith (born 1954) is a British biologist. She is Strategic Programme Leader at the John Innes Centre in Norwich and an Honorary Professor at the University of East Anglia (UEA) in the UK.

== Education ==
Smith was educated at the University of Cambridge where she was awarded a PhD in 1978 for research into the effect of anaerobiosis on plant metabolism.

== Research ==
Smith studies the metabolism in plants of starch and sucrose – the carbohydrate products of photosynthesis that fuel plant growth. Her research has uncovered metabolic pathways responsible for the synthesis and degradation of starch granules in plants. She showed that these processes in leaves are subject to complex control by the circadian clock over the day-night cycle, ensuring the availability of carbohydrate to fuel metabolism during the night. Her focus is now on the mechanisms underlying this control, and the way in which carbohydrate availability is integrated with other sources of information to determine rates and patterns of growth and development in plants. Smith uses information from her fundamental studies to examine starch turnover in crop plants.

Current research on starch synthesis in cereal grains has the potential to increase crop yield, and to change important functional and nutritional properties of flour. Her lab is also investigating the genetic, biochemical and molecular control of starch degradation in leaves and storage organs, and how this is coordinated with plant growth, germination and sprouting.

With George Coupland, Liam Dolan, Nicholas Harberd, Jonathan D. G. Jones, Cathie Martin, Robert Sablowski and Abigail Amey, Alison is a co-author of the textbook Plant Biology.

== Awards and honours ==
Smith was appointed an Officer of the Order of the British Empire (OBE) for services to plant biochemistry in the 2006 Birthday Honours. She was elected a fellow of the Royal Society (FRS) in 2016.

== Personal life ==
Alison Smith is the daughter of conservation pioneer Ted Smith (1920-2015) and the sister of arachnologist Dr Helen Smith.
