= George Coupland =

Scottish plant scientist (born 1959)

- Born: 20 December 1959 (age 66); Dumfries, Scotland
- Education: University of Edinburgh; University of Glasgow
- Spouse: Jane E. Parker
- Scientific career
- Fields: Biology
- Thesis: The conjugation system and insertion sequences of the IncN plasmid R46 (1984)
- Doctoral advisor: Neil Willetts; Richard Hayward; David Finnegan
- Website: www.mpipz.mpg.de/10586/coupland-dpt

George Michael Coupland FRS (born 20 December 1959, in Dumfries) is a Scottish plant scientist, and Research Scientist and Director of the Max Planck Institute for Plant Breeding Research.

== Education ==
Coupland earned a First Class Honours from University of Glasgow in 1981, and PhD from University of Edinburgh in 1984.

== Career and research ==
He was postdoctoral researcher at University of Cologne from 1985 to 1988. He was Research Group Leader at the Plant Breeding Institute, University of Cambridge, from 1989 to 1990. He was Research Group Leader at the John Innes Centre, from 1990 to 2001.

With Liam Dolan, Nicholas Harberd, Alison Mary Smith, Cathie Martin, Jonathan D. G. Jones, Robert Sablowski and Abigail Amey he is a co-author of the undergraduate textbook Plant Biology.

== Awards and honours ==
Coupland was elected a Fellow of the Royal Society in May 2007 and a foreign associate of the National Academy of Sciences in May 2012.

== Personal life ==
He is married to British botanist Jane E. Parker.
