= Future Trees Trust =

The Future Trees Trust is a charity that aims to improve and increase the stock of hardwood trees in Britain and Ireland.

== History ==
The British and Irish Hardwoods Improvement Programme (BIHIP) was established in 1991 with the aim of improving and increasing the stock of hardwood trees in Britain and Ireland. It was renamed the Future Trees Trust in 2008.

The Future Trees Trust is a registered charity in England and Wales, and Ireland. It is supported by a network of organisations, and has six species groups that lead research on: ash, birch, cherry, oak, sycamore, and walnut. In 2019 and 2020, it helped plant 3,000 ash trees in England to establish the Ash Archive. The archive consists of trees that have demonstrated resistance to the fungal pathogen Hymenoscyphus fraxineus.
