= Ash Archive =

The Ash Archive is a project founded in 2019 to restore ash trees to the landscape in England. English ash trees experienced massive dieback beginning in 2012 as a result of a fungal pathogen, Hymenoscyphus fraxineus. The archive contains over 3,000 trees, all of which propagated from the shoots of trees that had demonstrated some resistance to the fungus. The archive was established with £1.9 million (about USD 2.5 million) in government funding, and followed a five-year project to identify ash trees that were resistant to the fungus. One of the final trees in the archive was planted in January 2020 by Nicola Spence, the Chief Plant Health Officer of the UK government. Spence said, "I'm delighted to acknowledge the successes of the Ash Archive project and welcome the International Year of Plant Health by planting an ash dieback-tolerant tree."

The Ash Archive trees were planted in the county of Hampshire in an unspecified location by the Future Trees Trust. Propagated shoots came from trees in East Anglia. All the trees will be monitored for five years to identify those that are the most resistant to disease. These will form the basis of the future breeding program.
