= Nicholas Harberd =

Nicholas Harberd FRS
- Born: Nicholas Paul Harberd; 15 July 1956 (age 70)
- Education: University of Cambridge (MA, PhD)
- Known for: Seed to Seed: The Secret Life of Plants
- Scientific career
- Fields: Plant biology
- Workplaces: University of Oxford; University of California, Berkeley; Plant Breeding Institute, Cambridge
- Thesis: A genetical investigation of the alcohol dehydrogenase in barley (1981)
- Website: www.biology.ox.ac.uk/people/nicholas-harberd

Nicholas Paul Harberd FRS (born 15 July 1956) an Emeritus Professor of Plant Sciences at the University of Oxford and a Fellow of St. John's College, Oxford. He was previously Sibthorpian Professor and served as head of Department of Plant Sciences, University of Oxford before it became part of the Department of Biology, University of Oxford.

== Education ==
Harberd earned a Bachelor of Arts (BA) degree with Honours, a Master of Arts, and PhD in 1981, from the University of Cambridge where he was a student of Christ's College, Cambridge.

== Career and research ==
Harberd was a scientist at the Plant Breeding Institute in Trumpington, Cambridgeshire from 1982 to 1986, and the University of California, Berkeley, from 1986 to 1988.

Harberd led his laboratory, which was located at John Innes Centre, and subsequently at the University of Oxford from 2007. Harberd's research has been published in leading journals including Nature, Science, and Development.

With George Coupland, Liam Dolan, Alison Smith, Jonathan Jones, Cathie Martin, Robert Sablowski and Abigail Amey he is a co-author of the textbook Plant Biology.

=== Awards and honours ===
Harberd was elected a Fellow of the Royal Society (FRS) in 2009. His nomination reads:

Nick Harberd has made pioneering contributions to the solution of a fundamental problem in biology – the molecular mechanisms via which plant hormones control growth. He showed that the hormone gibberellin promotes growth by counteracting a family of nuclear growth-repressing proteins, and that this provides a key mechanism for adaptive regulation of growth in response to environmental change. He also showed how this mechanism underlies the action of genes responsible for the increase in yield of wheat varieties during the 'green revolution'. His discoveries have thus provided many important and original contributions to developmental, evolutionary and agricultural science.
