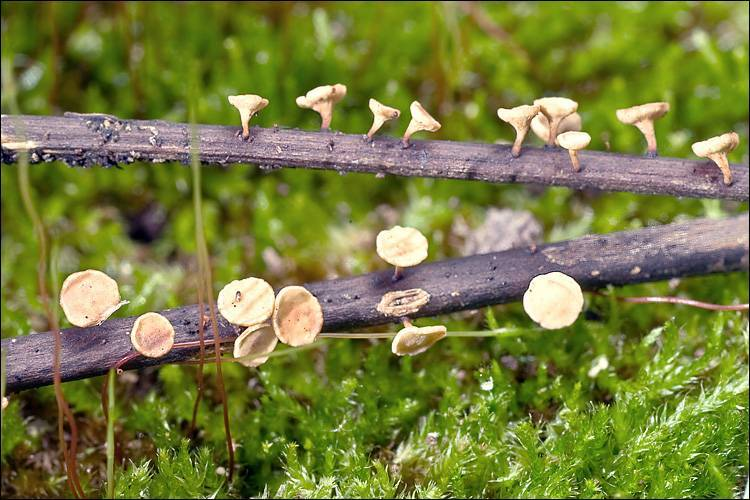
- Hymenoscyphus fraxineus

Scientific classification
- Kingdom: Fungi
- Division: Ascomycota
- Class: Leotiomycetes
- Order: Helotiales
- Family: Helotiaceae
- Genus: Hymenoscyphus; Gray (1821)

Type species
- Hymenoscyphus fructigenus (Bull.) Gray (1821)

Synonyms
- Peziza trib. Hymenoscypha Fr. (1822); Hymenoscypha (Fr.) W.Phillips (1887); Belospora Clem. (1909); Septatium Velen. (1934); Ciboriella Seaver (1951)

= Hymenoscyphus =

Genus of fungi

Hymenoscyphus is a genus of fungi in the family Helotiaceae. The genus contains about 155 species.

== Species ==
- Hymenoscyphus albidus
- Hymenoscyphus albopunctus
- Hymenoscyphus calyculus
- Hymenoscyphus fraxineus
- Hymenoscyphus fructigenus
- Hymenoscyphus salicinus
- Hymenoscyphus scutula
- Hymenoscyphus scutuloides
- Hymenoscyphus syringicolor
- Hymenoscyphus tetracladius
