= Ted Smith (conservationist) =

British conservation pioneer and English teacher (1920–2015)

- Born: Arthur Edward Smith; 24 August 1920; Alford, Lincolnshire
- Died: 13 September 2015 (aged 95)
- Title: Commander of the Order of the British Empire; Officer of the Order of the Golden Ark
- Spouse: Mary Goddard (m. 1949–2008, her death)
- Children: Alison Smith; Helen Smith

Arthur Edward Smith CBE was a British conservation pioneer and English teacher from Lincolnshire. He was primarily known for his work in founding the Lincolnshire Wildlife Trust, and in extending the Wildlife Trust movement across Britain to form what is now the Wildlife Trusts.

== Early life ==
Ted Smith came from a relatively poor background; his father Arthur was a plumber, and his parents ran a bakery and grocery shop. He attended Leeds University, and studied English, where he was taught by Bruce Dickins. He spent much of his adult life working firstly as a teacher in Leeds and then Norfolk, and then as an adult education tutor in Lincolnshire.

== Nature Conservation ==
The nature conservation movement started as a very elite movement in the United Kingdom, led by wealthy aristocrats or academics such as Charles Rothschild who initially envisaged a national network of nature reserves. After the Second World War, however, Smith drove the movement towards different goals and methods, most notably in recognising the threat from post-war agricultural methods and forming nature reserves that were accessible to the public and scientists. This was joined with the creation of more local wildlife trusts. Smith directly helped found the Lincolnshire Wildlife Trust as its first Honorary Secretary, and helped spark the foundation of other early trusts such as those in Cambridgeshire Wildlife Trust and Leicestershire Wildlife Trust. He particularly championed the creation of the nature reserve at Gibraltar Point, which provided a blueprint for his ideas compared to the less publicly accessible nature reserves founded by earlier conservationists. He was a member of the Lincolnshire Naturalists' Union and served as its President in 1968.

Later in life he became chairman and then President of the Lincolnshire Trust, holding the latter position until his death in 2015; he also became the Chairman of the England Committee of the Nature Conservancy Council (now Natural England) and first General Secretary of the Royal Society of Nature Conservation.

He received multiple awards for his work in nature conservation, including the CBE in 1998, having received the OBE in 1963. He was the first recipient of the Christopher Cadbury medal for nature conservation, was awarded an Honorary Doctorate of Science by the University of Lincolnshire and Humberside in 1999, and became an Officer of the Order of the Golden Ark in 2000. In 2012 he received a centenary award from the Wildlife Trusts, presented by his friend and colleague Sir David Attenborough. The Gibraltar Point nature reserve was dedicated to him in 2010.

== Personal life ==
Smith met Mary Goddard in 1948 on a trip to Skokholm, and married her in 1949. They have two surviving children; Professor Alison Smith, a prominent specialist in plant metabolism, and Dr Helen Smith, an arachnologist and president of the British Arachnological Society. He died on 13 September 2015.

He was a lifelong member of the Liberal party and its successor, the Liberal Democrats.
