= Daiwa Adrian Prize =

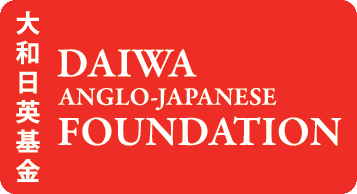
The Daiwa Anglo-Japanese Foundation logo

This Daiwa Adrian Prize is an award given by The Daiwa Anglo-Japanese Foundation, a UK charity, to scientists who have made significant achievements in science through Anglo-Japanese collaborative research. Prizes are awarded every third year and applications are handled by the foundation with an assessment conducted by a panel of Fellows of The Royal Society.

The prize was initiated 1992 by Lord Adrian (2nd Baron Adrian), a former Trustee of the Foundation. The physiologist Richard Adrian was Master of Pembroke College, Vice-Chancellor of the University of Cambridge and the only son of the Nobel laureate Edgar Adrian (1st Baron Adrian).

== Daiwa Adrian Prizes 2013 ==
The ceremony was held at the Royal Society on 26 November 2013 and was attended by Trustees of the Foundation including the Chairman, Sir Peter Williams, who is former Vice President of the Royal Society. The Prizes were presented by Lord Adrian's wife Lady Adrian.

Chemonostics: Using chemical receptors in the development of simple diagnostic devices for age-related diseases.

Institutions: University of Bath, University of Birmingham, Kyushu University, Tokyo Metropolitan University and University of Kitakyushu.
UK Team Leader: Professor Tony James, University of Bath
Japan Team Leader: Professor Seiji Shinkai, Kyushu University

Circadian regulation of photosynthesis: discovering mechanisms that connect the circadian clock with photosynthesis in chloroplasts in order to understand how circadian and environmental signals optimise photosynthesis and plant productivity.

Institutions: University of Bristol, University of Edinburgh, Chiba University and Tokyo Institute of Technology.
UK Team Leader: Dr Antony Dodd, University of Bristol
Japan Team Leader: Dr Mitsumasa Hanaoka, Chiba University

Exploration of active functionality in abundant oxide materials utilising unique nanostructure: discovering novel properties in traditional materials and addressing the limited availability of technologically important elements through curiosity-driven research.

Institutions: University College London and Tokyo Institute of Technology
UK Team Leader: Professor Alexander Shluger, University College London
Japan Team Leader: Professor Hideo Hosono, Tokyo Institute of Technology

Extension of terrestrial radiocarbon age calibration curve using annually laminated sediment core from Lake Suigetsu, Japan – establishing a reliable calibration for radiocarbon dates thus considerably improving the accuracy of the age determination.

Institutions: University of Newcastle, University of Oxford, NERC Radiocarbon Facility, Aberystwyth University, Nagoya University, Chiba University of Commerce, Osaka City University and University of Tokyo 
UK Team Leader: Professor Takeshi Nakagawa, University of Newcastle
Japan Team Leader: Professor Hiroyuki Kitagawa, Nagoya University

== Daiwa Adrian Prizes 2010 ==
The ceremony was held at the Royal Society on 2 December 2010 and was attended by Trustees of the Foundation including the then Chairman, Sir John Whitehead, and Sir Peter Williams. The Prizes were presented by Lord Adrian's wife Lady Adrian.

- Nonlinear dynamics of cortical neurons and gamma oscillations - from cell to network models. Advancement of knowledge of the basic operation of brain networks, contributing to understanding of disorders such as schizophrenia, Alzheimer’s disease and epilepsy.
  - University of Cambridge/Harvard University/Karolinska Institutet: Hugh Robinson, Nathan Gouwens, Hugo Zeberg, Rita Kalra
  - University of Tokyo/Osaka University: Kazuyuki Aihara, Kenji Morita, Kunichika Tsumoto, Takashi Tateno, Kantaro Fujiwara

- The evolutionary and spatial dynamics of human viral pathogens. Investigation of the spread of human viruses, particularly HIV and Hepatitis C, why outbreaks begin at certain times and in certain locations, and why virus strains follow particular routes when they disseminate internationally.
  - University of Oxford: Oliver Pybus, Samir Bhatt, Peter Markov, Joe Parker, Aris Katzourakis
  - National Institute of Infectious Diseases: Yutaka Takebe, Yue Li, Shigeru Kusagawa, Kok Keng Tee, Takayo Tsuchiura

- Photonic quantum information science and technology. Development of new technologies based on harnessing quantum mechanics – the fundamental physics theory governing behaviour at the microscopic scale.
  - University of Bristol: Jeremy O'Brien
  - Hokkaido University/Osaka University: Shigeki Takeuchi

- Non-linear cosmological perturbations. Providing theoretical predictions from the very early universe physics for the statistical properties of primordial curvature perturbations.
  - University of Portsmouth: David Wands, Marco Bruni, Robert Crittenden, Kazuya Koyama, Roy Maartens, Cyril Pitrou
  - Kyoto University: Misao Sasaki, Tetsuya Shiromizu, Jiro Soda, Takahiro Tanaka

- Use of genomics to understand plant-pathogen interactions. Understanding plant pathogen interactions to enhance knowledge on plant disease control.
  - The Sainsbury Laboratory: Sophien Kamoun, Joe Win, Liliana M. Cano, Angela Chaparro-Garcia, Tolga O. Bozkurt, Sebastian Schornack
  - Iwate Biotechnology Research Center: Ryohei Terauchi, Kentaro Yoshida, Hiromasa Saitoh, Koki Fujisaki, Ayako Miya, Muluneh Tamiru

- Phase space analysis of partial differential equations. Analysis of a range of properties exhibited by solutions to evolution partial differential equations which are of major importance in many different sciences.
  - Imperial College London: Michael Ruzhansky, Jens Wirth, Claudia Garetto, Ilia Kamotski
  - Nagoya University/Tokai University/Yamaguchi University/Osaka University: Mitsuru Sugimoto, Tokio Matsuyama, Fumihiko Hirosawa
