= Jonathan D. G. Jones =

British geneticist

Jonathan Jones FRS
- Born: Jonathan Dallas George Jones; 14 July 1954 (age 72)
- Education: University of Cambridge (BA, PhD)
- Known for: Work on R genes
- Spouse: Caroline Dean (m. 1991)
- Awards: EMBO Membership (1998); Member of the National Academy of Sciences (2015); Wolf Prize in Agriculture (2025)
- Scientific career
- Fields: Plant disease Immunity
- Workplaces: Harvard University; Sainsbury Laboratory; University of East Anglia
- Thesis: Repeated DNA sequences in rye (Secale cereale), wheat (Triticum aestivum) and their relatives (1980)
- Doctoral advisor: Richard B. Flavell
- Website: www.tsl.ac.uk/about/people/jonathan-jones

Jonathan Dallas George Jones FRS (born 14 July 1954) is a senior scientist at the Sainsbury Laboratory and a professor at the University of East Anglia using molecular and genetic approaches to study disease resistance in plants.

== Education ==
Jones was educated at the University of Cambridge where he studied the Natural Sciences Tripos as a student of Peterhouse, Cambridge and graduated with a Bachelor of Arts degree in 1976 followed by a PhD in 1980 supervised by Richard B. Flavell and Gabriel Dover.

== Research and career ==
After his PhD, Jones did postdoctoral research at Harvard University in Frederick M. Ausubel's lab. Along with collaborator Jeffery Dangl, he proposed the zigzag model for the co-evolution of plant resistance genes and pathogen effectors. He also proposed the guard hypothesis, which provides a testable explanation for how plants overcome the large number of arms used by pathogens to evoke disease while having only a limited set of plant proteins to defend itself. Previously, it was thought that pattern-triggered immunity and effector-triggered immunity functioned independently, but Jones and colleagues demonstrated that these pathways are interdependent and potentiate each other, synergistically reaching an effective threshold of plant immunity.

Jones has served as head of the Sainsbury Laboratory from 1994 to 1997 and 2003 – 2009. He is also a professor at University of East Anglia and has served as editor of The Plant Cell and Genome Biology. Other positions he has held include:

- International Society of Plant Molecular Biology board member 1995-8
- Advisory Board 1995-8 of The Plant Journal
- Editor of Plant Cell July 1998 -2004
- Current Opinion in Plant Biology (COPB) Editorial Board 1997–present
- Invited Editor for COPB Plant/microbe interaction issue 1998
- Editor of Genome Biology 2001–2004
- Founder of Mendel Biotechnology that has collaborated with Monsanto

With George Coupland, Liam Dolan, Nicholas Harberd, Alison Mary Smith, Cathie Martin, Robert Sablowski and Abigail Amey he is a co-author of the textbook Plant Biology.

In July 2010, Jones contributed an opinion piece to BBC News Online, outlining his stance on genetically modified (GM) food crops. In the piece, Jones argued that if we are to 'feed the planet without destroying it... we need to use every tool in our toolbox, including GM'.

=== Awards and honours ===
Jones was elected a Fellow of the Royal Society (FRS) in 2003 and has been a member of the National Academy of Sciences since 2015. He was awarded EMBO Membership in 1998. In 2025 he was awarded the Wolf Prize in Agriculture.
