= Sainsbury Laboratory =

Plant research laboratory in Norwich, Norfolk, England

The Sainsbury Laboratory
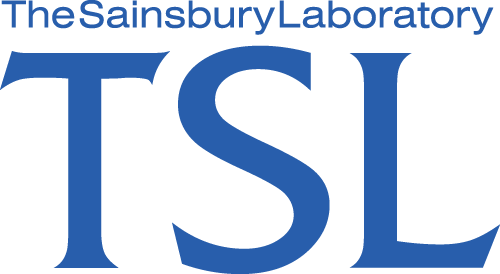
- Abbreviation: TSL
- Formation: 1988; 38 years ago
- Type: Research institute
- Headquarters: Norwich, UK
- Key people: Nick Talbot; Jonathan Jones Sophien Kamoun
- Affiliations: University of East Anglia
- Website: tsl.ac.uk

The Sainsbury Laboratory (TSL) is a research institute located at the Norwich Research Park in Norwich, Norfolk, England, that carries out fundamental biological research and technology development on aspects of plant disease, plant disease resistance and microbial symbiosis in plants. The Sainsbury Laboratory partners with the John Innes Centre on a Plant Health Institute Strategic Program (ISP) funded by the Biotechnology and Biological Sciences Research Council (BBSRC).

== History ==
In 1987, an agreement was signed to establish The Sainsbury Laboratory. This agreement made the laboratory a joint venture between several organizations, including the Gatsby Charitable Foundation (established by David Sainsbury, the great-grandson of the founder of the Sainsbury's chain of supermarkets), the John Innes Foundation, the University of East Anglia, and the Agricultural and Food Research Council (now BBSRC). Later that year, the laboratory employed its first members of staff. Then, in 1989, The Sainsbury Laboratory moved into its current building. This building was constructed alongside the John Innes Centre on the Norwich Research Park.

== Research ==
The Sainsbury Laboratory conducts research on various topics related to plant-microbe interactions. It investigates innate immune recognition in plants and the signaling and cellular changes that occur during plant-microbe interactions. Additionally, researchers at the laboratory study plant and pathogen genomics to gain a better understanding of the mechanisms involved in plant-microbe interactions.

One of the key areas of research is the identification and study of plant disease resistance genes. Another important research area is the biology of pathogen effector proteins, which play a crucial role in the interaction between plants and pathogens. With this knowledge, the laboratory employs biotechnological approaches to develop crop disease resistance. These approaches are aimed at reducing agrochemical input and the percentage of crops lost to disease.

== Training ==
The Sainsbury Laboratory provides a training environment with the intention of preparing post-graduate students, post-doctoral scientists and early career project leaders to excel in their careers. This includes training from the expert technology groups in plant tissue culture and transformation, bioinformatics and computational biology, proteomics, and synthetic biology as well as mentoring from established scientists. In 2021, The Sainsbury Laboratory launched a one-year taught MSc in Global Plant Health in partnership with the University of East Anglia.

== Facilities ==
=== Technology development ===
The four core technology teams of TSL develop new technologies to enhance TSL research and provide direct expert support and guidance to the other groups of TSL.

- Bioinformatics – Dan MacLean
- Proteomics – Frank Menke
- Synthetic Biology – Mark Youles
- Tissue Culture and Transformation – Jodie Taylor

== Notable people ==
A number of scientists have worked at TSL including;

- David Baulcombe
- Jonathan D. G. Jones
- Martin Parniske
- Sophien Kamoun
- Nick Talbot

== Funding ==
The Gatsby Charitable Foundation is a core funder of The Sainsbury Laboratory in addition to The University of East Anglia and a BBSRC Institute Strategic Programme Grant in Plant Health (in partnership with the John Innes Centre). The remainder of funds are sourced from competitive BBSRC and European Research Council grants, charitable and philanthropic donations and, for some research programmes, commercial companies.

== See also ==
- Sainsbury Laboratory Cambridge University
