= Max Planck Institute for Plant Breeding Research =

German research institute

Coordinates: 50°57′35″N 6°51′35″E

The Max Planck Institute for Plant Breeding Research was founded in Müncheberg, Germany in 1928 as part of the Kaiser-Wilhelm-Gesellschaft. The founding director, Erwin Baur, initiated breeding programmes with fruits and berries, and basic research on Antirrhinum majus and the domestication of lupins. After the Second World War, the institute moved west to Voldagsen, and was relocated to new buildings on the present site in Cologne in 1955.

The modern era of the Institute began in 1978 with the appointment of Jeff Schell and the development of plant transformation technologies and plant molecular genetics. The focus on molecular genetics was extended in 1980 with the appointment of Heinz Saedler. The appointment in 1983 of Klaus Hahlbrock broadened the expertise of the Institute in the area of plant biochemistry, and the arrival of Francesco Salamini in 1985 added a focus on crop genetics. During the period 1978-1990, the Institute was greatly expanded and new buildings were constructed for the departments led by Schell, Hahlbrock and Salamini, in addition to a new lecture hall and the Max Delbrück Laboratory building that housed independent research groups over a period of 10 years.

A new generation of directors was appointed from 2000 with the approaching retirements of Klaus Hahlbrock and Jeff Schell. Paul Schulze-Lefert and George Coupland were appointed in 2000 and 2001, respectively, and Maarten Koornneef arrived three years later upon the retirement of Francesco Salamini. The new scientific departments brought a strong focus on utilising model species to understand the regulatory principles and molecular mechanisms underlying selected traits. The longer-term aim is to translate these discoveries to breeding programmes through the development of rational breeding concepts. The arrival of a new generation of Directors also required modernisation of the infrastructure. So far, this has involved complete refurbishment of the building that houses the Plant Developmental Biology laboratory (2004), construction of a new guesthouse and library (2005), planning of new buildings for the administration and technical workshops (2009), and a new laboratory building completed in May 2012. The new laboratory building includes a section that links the three scientific departments, offices and the Bioinformatics Research Group.

== Departments ==
- Department of Plant Developmental Biology (George Coupland)
- Department of Plant Microbe Interactions (Paul Schulze-Lefert)
- Department of Comparative Development and Genetics (Miltos Tsiantis)
- Department of Chromosome Biology (Raphael Mercier)

== Independent research groups ==
- Regulation of stamen maturation in barley and Arabidopsis (Ivan Acosta)
- The evolution of annual and perennial life strategies (Maria Albani)
- Root-environment communication (Tonni Grube Andersen)
- Structural Biology (Jijie Chai)
- Transport Processes in Crop Plants (Wolf B. Frommer)
- Molecular basis of adaptive evolution (Angela Hancock)
- Genetic basis for phenotypic evolution (Angela Hay)
- Basic Immune System of Plants (Hirofumi Nakagami)
- Quantitative Genetics and Genomics of Plants (Benjamin Stich)
- Genetic and molecular analysis of shoot branching in higher plants (Klaus Theres)
- Drought adaptation and flowering time control in barley (Maria von Korff)

== Graduate program ==
Beginning in 1999 the Max Planck Society initiated the implementation of International Max Planck Research Schools (IMPRS) as a new way to cooperate with partner universities in Germany. The intention of this ambitious plan is twofold. On the one hand, the Max Planck Society tries to intensify the collaboration with university affiliated research groups and faculty at home. On the other hand, due to the great demand of junior scientists, one was trying to attract qualified students from Germany and abroad to help train a new generation of scientists. It seemed reasonable to combine scientific leadership and technical expertise on a local scale by jointly offering this new way to train promising scientists from around the world. The Ph.D. program provides an interdisciplinary approach for highly motivated students to receive a Ph.D. degree and to participate in cutting edge research. Major changes and adjustments were necessary to put this idea into reality. First, because of the international character, teaching and practical training had to be offered in English to make the program attractive for foreign students. Second, the training should target a very specific area of research for which the existing faculty is internationally known. Third, the research schools are intended to represent centres of excellence. The IMPRS at the Max Planck Institute of Plant Breeding Research together with the University of Cologne represent such a centre of excellence in the area of molecular plant science, and was formed in 2001. Currently, this IMPRS has about 40 Ph.D. students, where half come from countries outside of Germany. Admission is entirely linked to scientific merit and achievement.
