= EMBO Membership =

Member of the European Molecular Biology Organization
- Awarded for: research excellence and the outstanding achievements made by a life scientist
- Location: Heidelberg, Germany
- Website: people.embo.org; embo.org/members

Membership of the European Molecular Biology Organization (EMBO Member) is an award granted by the European Molecular Biology Organization (EMBO) in recognition of "research excellence and the outstanding achievements made by a life scientist".

As of 2018, 88 EMBO Members and Associate Members have been awarded Nobel Prizes in either Physiology or Medicine, Chemistry or Physics. See Category:Members of the European Molecular Biology Organization for examples of EMBO members.

== Nomination and election of new members ==
Elections for membership are held annually with candidates for membership being nominated and elected exclusively by existing EMBO members, membership cannot be applied for directly. Three types of membership exist:

1. EMBO Member, for scientists living (or who have lived) in a European Molecular Biology Conference (EMBC) Member State
2. EMBO Associate Member, for scientists living outside of the EMBC Member States
3. EMBO Young Investigator

== See also ==
- List of biology awards
