= Climate-friendly gardening =

Gardening practices that aim to reduce and mitigate climate change

Climate-friendly gardening refers to gardening practices that aim to reduce the release of greenhouse gases like carbon dioxide, methane and nitrous oxide in order to aid the reduction of global warming. These practices can include soil management, rain capture, cultivating native plants, and utilizing biochar, nitrogen-fixing plants and compost in order to eliminate the use of chemical fertilizers. Avoiding actions like burning garden waste, excessive digging and the utilization of gas-powered tools may also help to lower greenhouse gas emissions. Techniques such as planting trees and ground cover, utilizing mulch and limiting soil disturbances can aid in soil health and the sequestering of carbon in the soil.

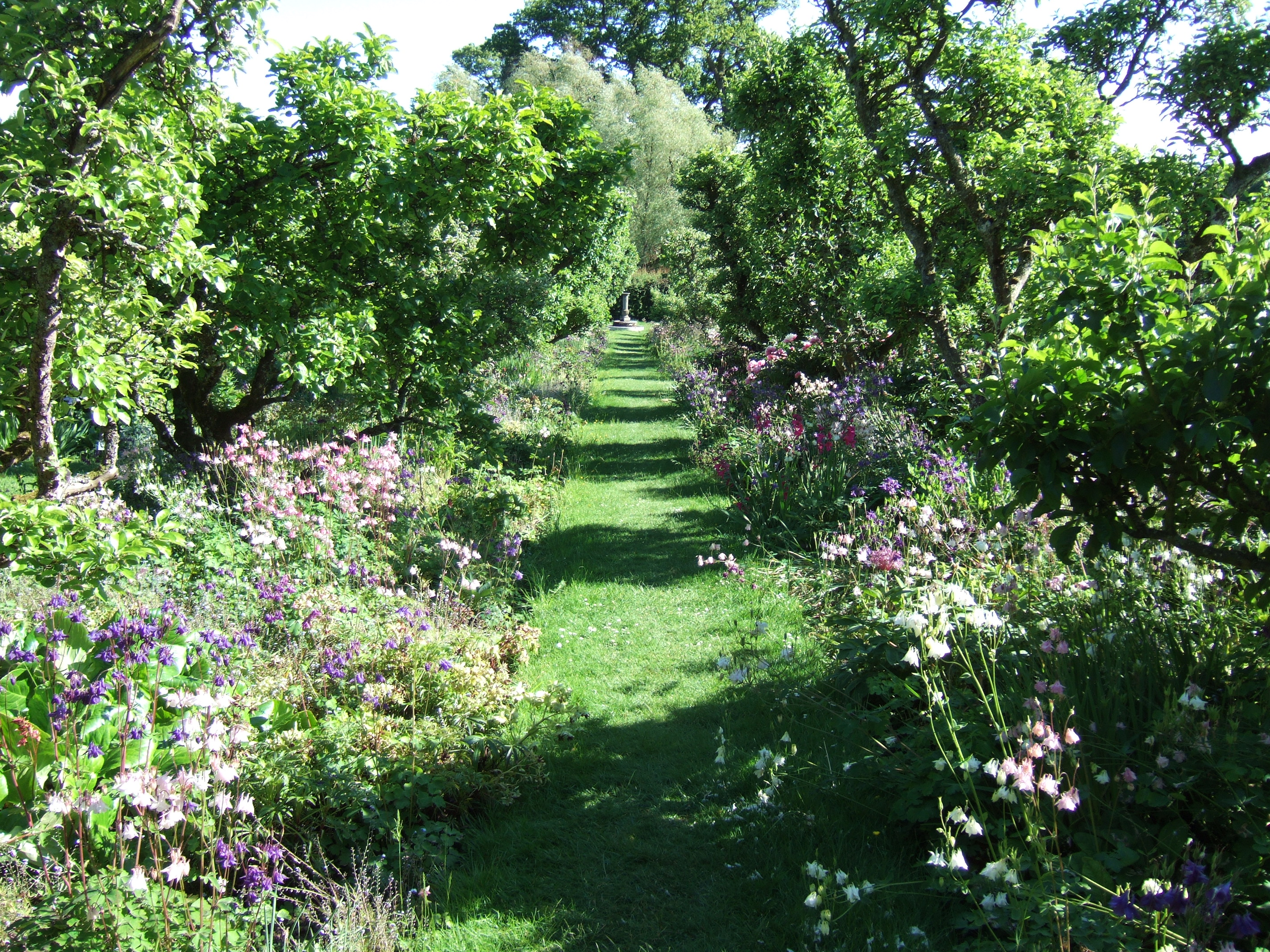
Orchard garden showing orchard trees, herbaceous perennials and ground-cover plants, at Hergest Croft Gardens, Herefordshire, Britain

== Land use and greenhouse gases ==
The burning of fossil fuels is the main source of the excess greenhouse gases causing climate change, but there are other sources to consider as well. A special report from the Intergovernmental Panel on Climate Change (IPCC) estimated that, in the last 150 years, fossil fuels and cement production have been responsible for only about two-thirds of climate change while the other third has been caused by human land use.

The three main greenhouse gases produced by unsustainable land use are carbon dioxide, methane, and nitrous oxide. Black carbon, or soot, can also be a product of unsustainable land use, and, despite not being a gas, it can behave like greenhouse gases and contribute to climate change.

=== Carbon dioxide ===
Carbon dioxide, CO_{2}, is a natural part of the carbon cycle, but human land uses often creates excess amounts, especially from habitat destruction and the cultivation of soil. When woodlands, wetlands, and other natural habitats are turned into pasture, arable fields, buildings and roads, the carbon held in the soil and vegetation becomes extra carbon dioxide and methane to extract more heat in the atmosphere.

Gardeners may cause extra carbon dioxide to be added to the atmosphere in several ways:

- Using peat or potting compost containing peat;
- Buying garden furniture or other wooden products made from woodland which has been destroyed rather than taken as a renewable crop from sustainably managed woodland;
- Digging the soil and leaving it bare so that the carbon in soil organic matter is oxidised;
- Using power tools which burn fossil fuel or electricity generated by burning fossil fuel;
- Using patio heaters;
- Heating greenhouses by burning fossil fuel or electricity generated by burning fossil fuel;
- Burning garden prunings and weeds on a bonfire, though pyrolysis of wood turns 35% of its carbon (which would otherwise decompose to CO_{2}) into biochar, which remains stable in the soil for thousands of years;
- Buying tools, pesticides, synthetic nitrogen fertilizers (over 2 kilograms of carbon dioxide equivalent is produced in the manufacture of each kilogram of ammonium nitrate), and other materials which have been manufactured using fossil fuel;
- Heating and treating swimming pools by burning fossil fuel or electricity generated by burning fossil fuel;
- Watering their gardens with tapwater, which has been treated and pumped by burning fossil fuel, with a greenhouse gas impact of about 1 kg CO_{2}e/m^{3} water.
- Buying garden products which have been transported by vehicles powered by fossil fuel.

=== Methane ===
Methane, CH_{4}, is a natural part of the carbon cycle, but human land uses often add more, especially from anaerobic soil, artificial wetlands such as rice fields, and from the guts of farm animals, especially ruminants such as cattle and sheep.

Gardeners may cause extra methane to be added to the atmosphere in several ways:

- Compacting soil so that it becomes anaerobic, for example by treading on soil when it is wet;
- Allowing compost heaps to become compacted and anaerobic;
- Creating homemade liquid feed by putting the leaves of plants such as comfrey under water, with the unintended consequence that the plants may release methane as they decay;
- Killing pernicious weeds by covering them with water, with the unintended consequence that the plants may release methane as they decay;
- Allowing ponds to become anaerobic, for example, by adding unsuitable fish species which stir up sediment that then blocks light from and kills submerged oxygenating plants.

=== Nitrous oxide ===
Nitrous oxide, N_{2}O, is a natural part of the nitrogen cycle, but human land uses often add more.

Gardeners may cause extra nitrous oxide to be added to the atmosphere by:

- Using synthetic nitrogen fertilizer, for example "weed and feed" on lawns, especially if it is applied when plants are not actively growing, the soil is compacted, or when other factors are limiting so that the plants cannot make use of the nitrogen;
- Compacting the soil, such as by working in the garden when the soil is wet, which will increase the conversion of nitrates to nitrous oxide by soil bacteria;
- Burning garden waste on bonfires.

=== Black carbon ===
Black carbon is not a gas, but it acts like a greenhouse gas because it can be suspended in the atmosphere and absorb heat.

Gardeners may cause extra black carbon to be added to the atmosphere by burning garden prunings and weeds on bonfires, especially if the waste is wet and becomes black carbon in the form of soot. Gardeners are also responsible for extra black carbon produced when they buy garden products which have been transported by vehicles powered by fossil fuel especially the diesel used in most lorries.

== Gardening to reduce greenhouse gas emissions and absorb carbon dioxide ==
There are many ways in which climate-friendly gardeners may reduce their contribution to climate change and help their gardens absorb carbon dioxide from the atmosphere.

Climate-friendly gardeners can find good ideas in many other sustainable approaches:

- Agroforestry;
- Forest gardening;
- Orchards;
- Organic gardening;
- Permaculture;
- Rain garden;
- Vegan organic gardening;
- Water-wise gardening;
- Wildlife garden;
- Biochar.

== Protecting and enhancing carbon stores ==
=== Protecting carbon stores in land beyond gardens ===
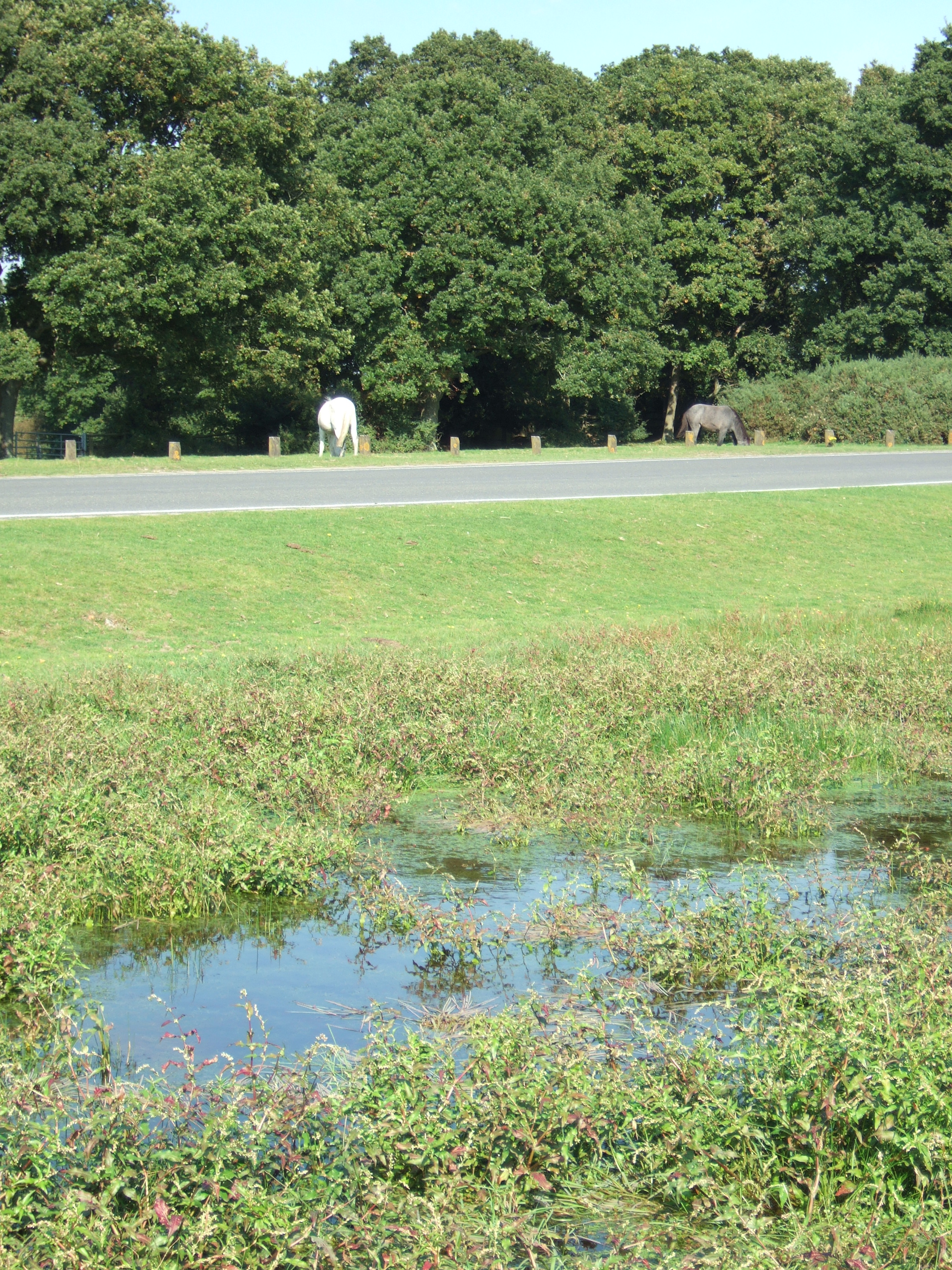
Woodland and wetland in the New Forest, Hampshire

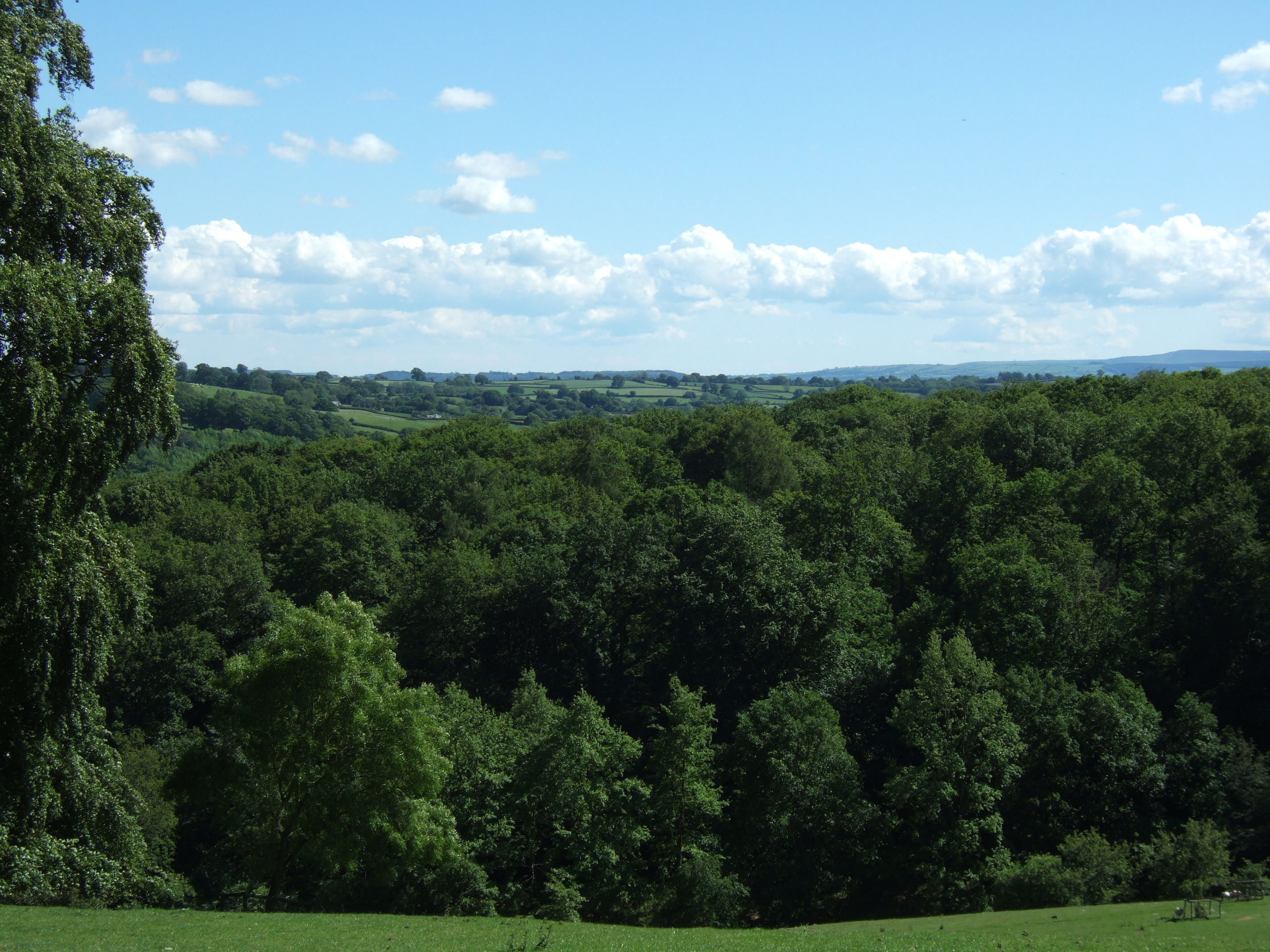
Woodland and trees in Herefordshire

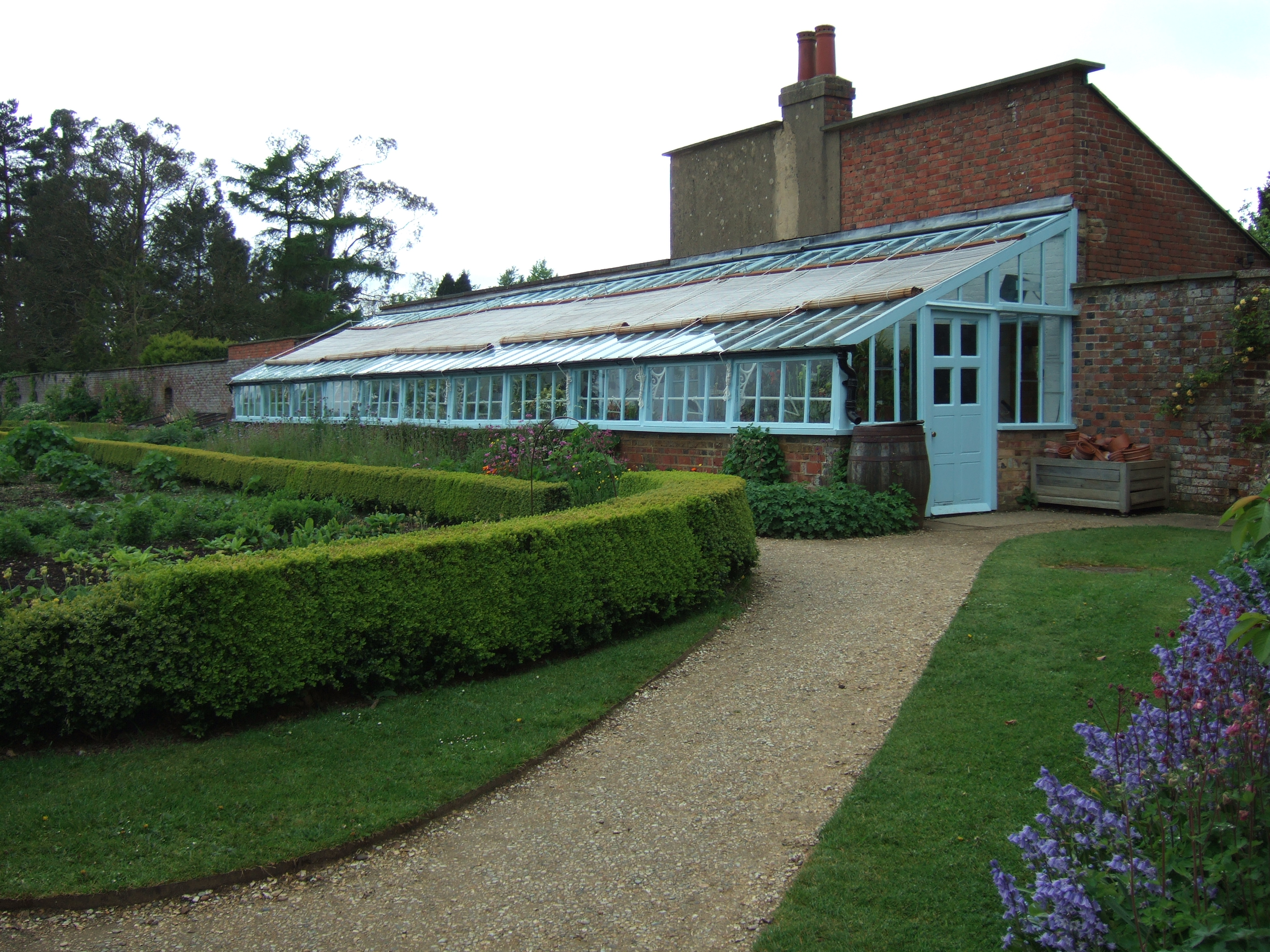
Kitchen garden at Charles Darwin's home, Down House, Kent, showing greenhouse, waterbutt, box hedging and vegetable beds

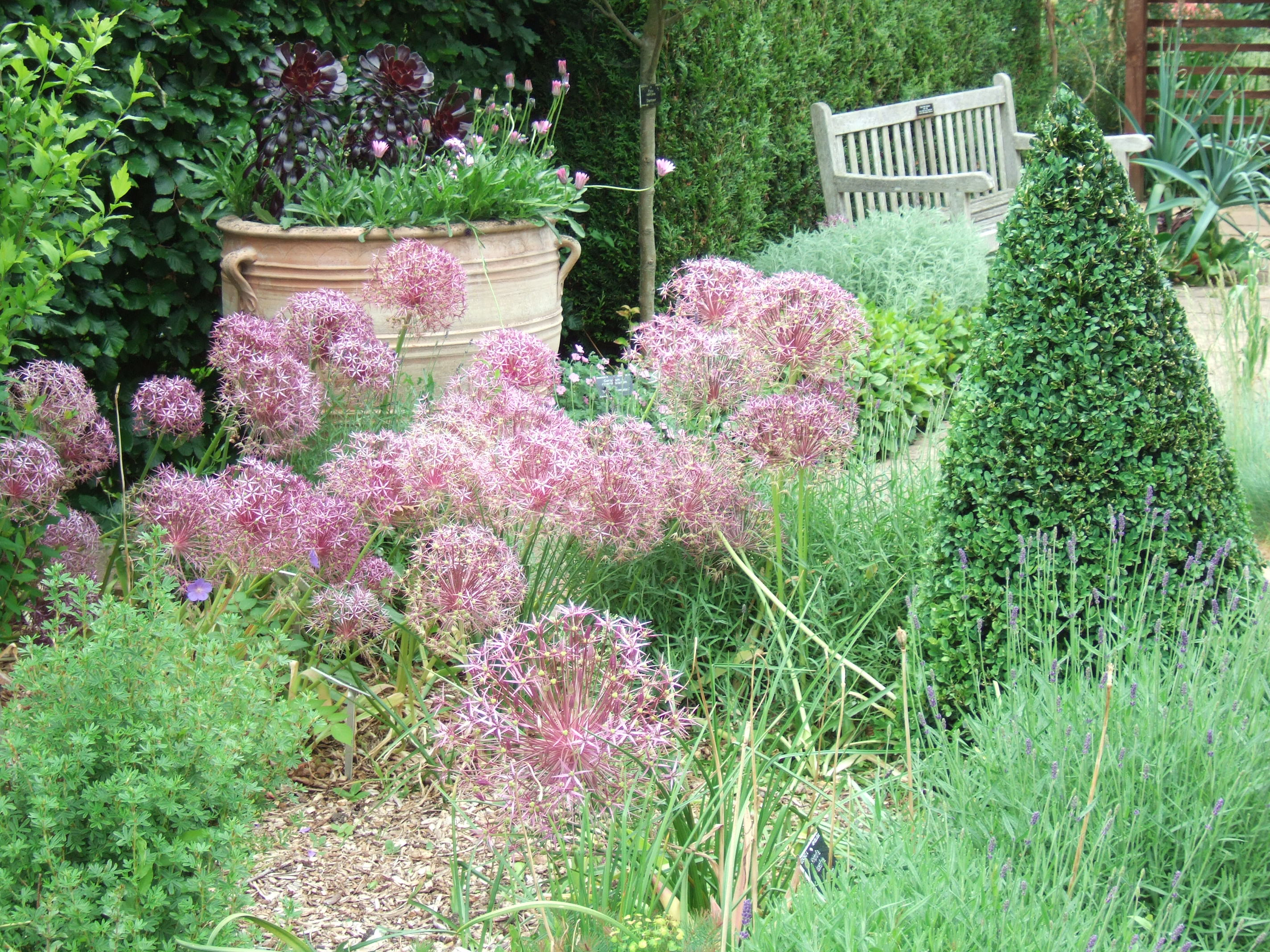
Alliums, lavender, box and other water-thrifty plants in the dry garden at Cambridge Botanic Garden

Climate-friendly gardening includes actions which protect carbon stores beyond gardens. The biggest carbon stores in land are in soil; the two habitat types with the biggest carbon stores per hectare are woods and wetlands; and woods absorb more carbon dioxide per hectare per year than most other habitats. Climate-friendly gardeners therefore aim to ensure that nothing they do will harm these habitats.

According to Morison and Morecroft (eds.)'s Plant Growth and Climate Change, the net primary productivity (the net amount of carbon absorbed each year) of various habitats is:

- Tropical forests: 12.5 tonnes of carbon per hectare per year;
- Temperate forests: 7.7 tonnes of carbon per hectare per year;
- Temperate grasslands: 3.7 tonnes of carbon per hectare per year;
- Croplands: 3.1 tonnes of carbon per hectare per year.

The Intergovernmental Panel on Climate Change's Special Report Land use, land-use change, and forestry lists the carbon contained in different global habitats as:

- Wetlands: 643 tonnes carbon per hectare in soil + 43 tonnes carbon per hectare in vegetation = total 686 tonnes carbon per hectare;
- Tropical forests: 123 tonnes carbon per hectare in soil + 120 tonnes carbon per hectare in vegetation = total 243 tonnes carbon per hectare;
- Temperate forests: 96 tonnes carbon per hectare in soil + 57 tonnes carbon per hectare in vegetation = total 153 tonnes carbon per hectare;
- Temperate grasslands: 164 tonnes carbon per hectare in soil + 7 tonnes carbon per hectare in vegetation = total 171 tonnes carbon per hectare;
- Croplands: 80 tonnes carbon per hectare in soil + 2 tonnes carbon per hectare in vegetation = total 82 tonnes carbon per hectare.

The figures quoted above are global averages. More recent research in 2009 has found that the habitat with the world's highest known total carbon density - 1,867 tonnes of carbon per hectare - is temperate moist forest of Eucalyptus regnans in the Central Highlands of south-east Australia; and, in general, that temperate forests contain more carbon than either boreal forests or tropical forests.

=== Carbon stores in Britain ===
According to Milne and Brown's 1997 paper "Carbon in the vegetation and soils of Great Britain", Britain's vegetation and soil are estimated to contain 9952 million tonnes of carbon, of which almost all is in the soil, and most in Scottish peatland soil:

- Soils in Scotland: 6948 million tonnes carbon;
- Soils in England and Wales: 2890 million tonnes carbon;
- Vegetation in British woods and plantations (which cover only 11% of Britain's land area): 91 million tonnes carbon;
- Other vegetation: 23 million tonnes carbon.

A 2005 report suggested that British woodland soil may contain as much as 250 tonnes of carbon per hectare.

Many studies of soil carbon only study the carbon in the top 30 centimetres, but soil is often much deeper than that, especially below woodland. One 2009 study of the United Kingdom's carbon stores by Keith Dyson and others gives figures for soil carbon down to 100 cm below the habitats, including "Forestland", "Cropland" and "Grassland", covered by the Kyoto Protocol reporting requirements.

- Forestland soils: average figures in tonnes carbon per hectare are 160 (England), 428 (Scotland), 203 (Wales), and 366 (Northern Ireland).
- Grassland soils: average figures in tonnes carbon per hectare are 148 (England), 386 (Scotland), 171 (Wales), and 304 (Northern Ireland).
- Cropland soils: average figures in tonnes carbon per hectare are 110 (England), 159 (Scotland), 108 (Wales), and 222 (Northern Ireland).

=== Protecting carbon stores in wetland ===
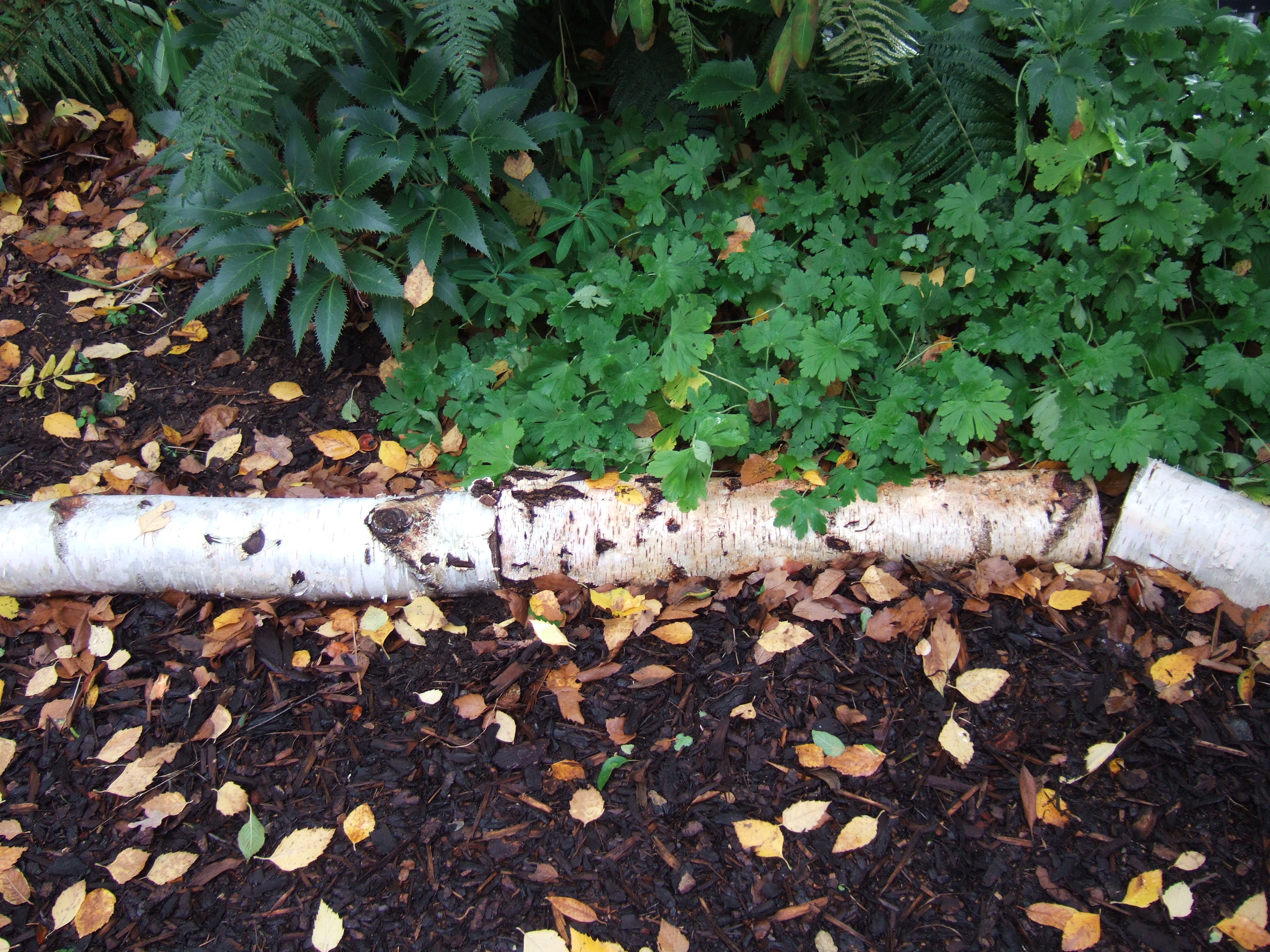
Permeable paving of wood chip with birch-log edging at the Royal Horticultural Society garden at Wisley

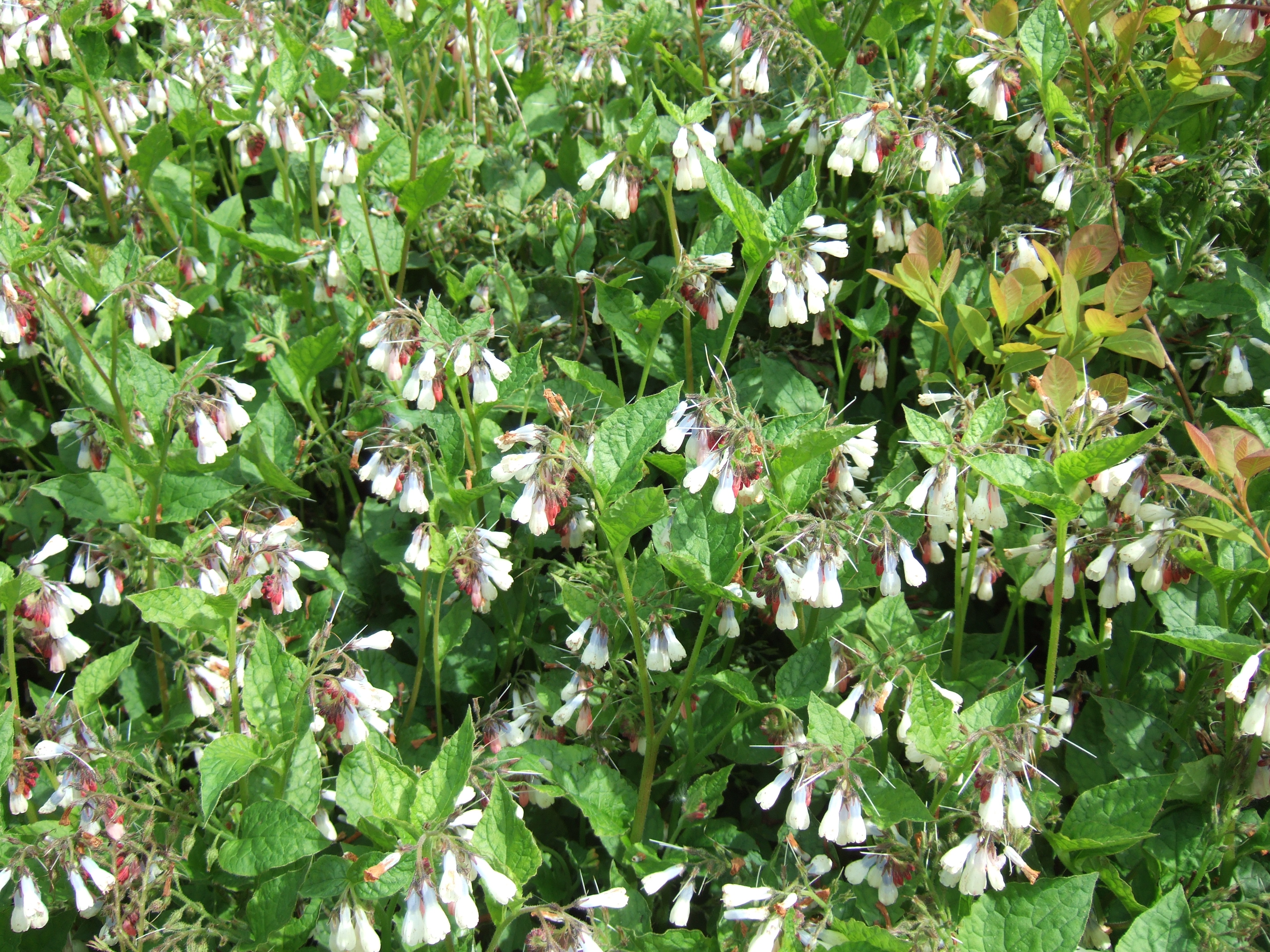
A ground-cover and rain-garden plant, Symphytum grandiflorum (creeping comfrey), with Cotinus coggygria

Climate-friendly gardeners choose peat-free composts because some of the planet's biggest carbon stores are in soil, and especially in the peatland soil of wetlands.

The Intergovernmental Panel on Climate Change's Special Report Land Use, Land-Use Change and Forestry gives a figure of 2011 gigatonnes of carbon for global carbon stocks in the top 1 metre of soils, much more than the carbon stores in the vegetation or the atmosphere.

Climate-friendly gardeners also avoid using tapwater not only because of the greenhouse gases emitted when fossil fuels are burnt to treat and pump water, but because if water is taken from wetlands, the carbon stores are more likely to be oxidized to carbon dioxide.

A climate-friendly garden therefore does not contain large irrigated lawns, but instead includes water-butts to collect rainwater, water-thrifty plants which survive on rainwater and do not need watering after they are established, trees, shrubs and hedges to shelter gardens from the drying effects of sun and wind, and groundcover plants and organic mulch to protect the soil and keep it moist.^{p. 242}^{p. 80–82}

Climate-friendly gardeners will ensure that any paved surfaces in their gardens (which are kept to a minimum to increase carbon stores) are permeable, and may also make rain gardens, sunken areas into which rainwater from buildings and paving is directed, so that the rain can then be fed back into groundwater rather than going into storm drains. The plants in rain gardens must be able to grow in both dry and wet soils.

=== Protecting carbon stores in woodland ===
Wetlands may store the most carbon in their soils, but woods store more carbon in their living biomass than any other type of vegetation, and their soils store the most carbon after wetlands. Climate-friendly gardeners therefore ensure that any wooden products they buy, such as garden furniture, have been made of wood from sustainably managed woodland.

=== Protecting and increasing carbon stores in gardens ===
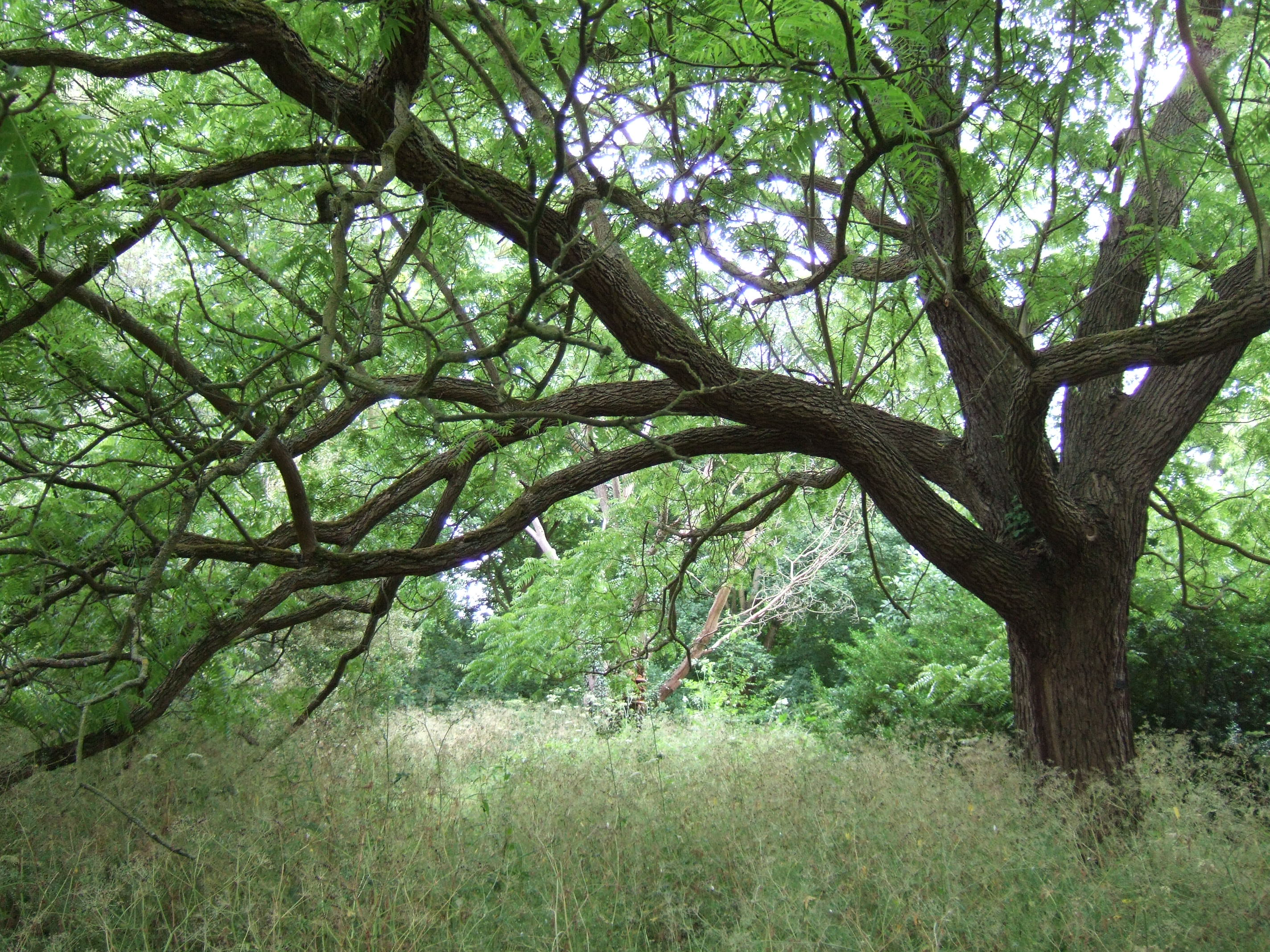
Juglans elaeopyren (American walnut) at Cambridge Botanic Garden

After rocks containing carbonate compounds, soil is known to be the biggest store of carbon on land. Carbon is found in soil organic matter, including living organisms (plant roots, fungi, animals, protists, bacteria), dead organisms, and humus. One study of the environmental benefits of gardens estimates that 86% of carbon stores in gardens is in the soil.

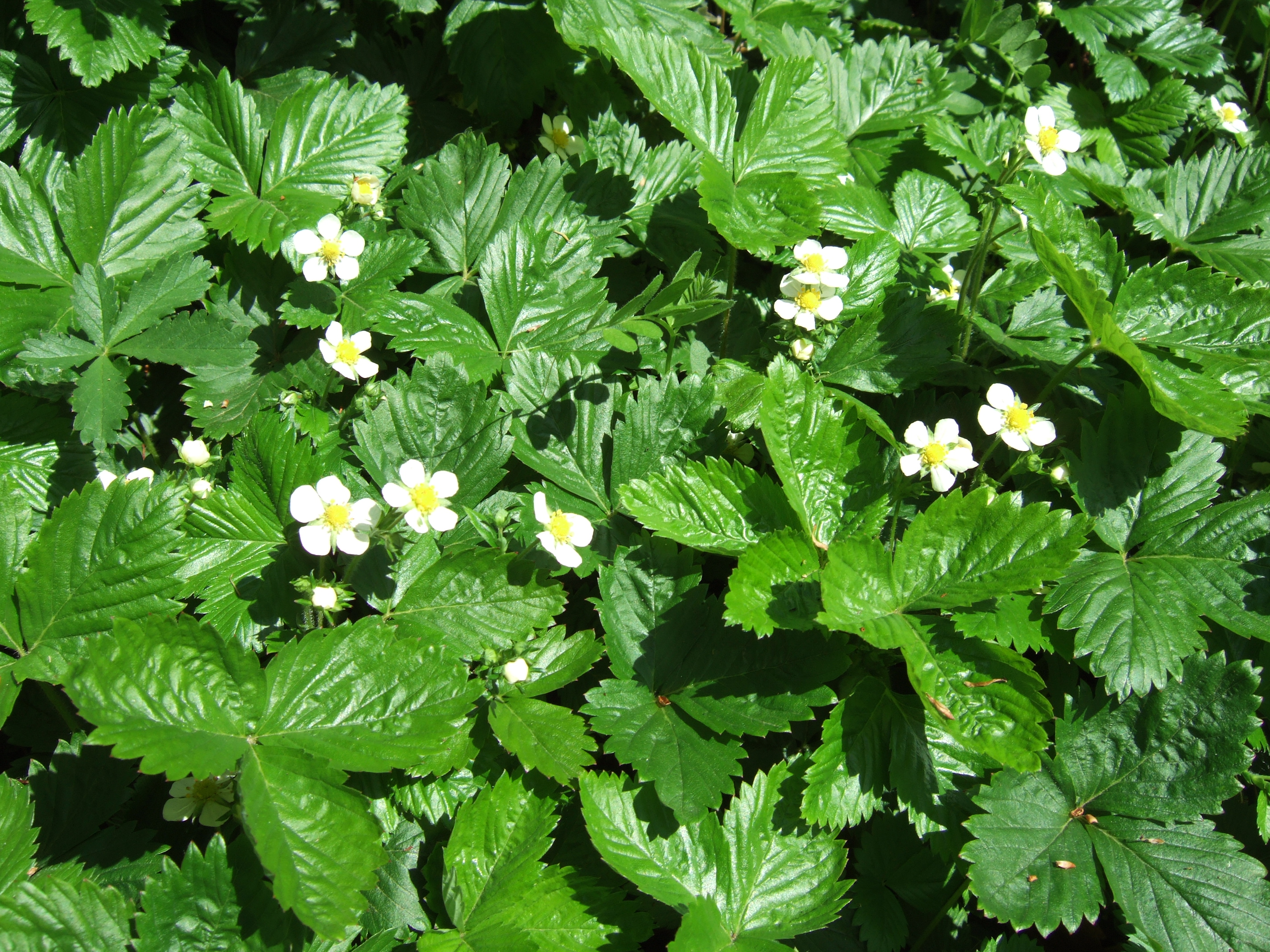
Wild strawberries in flower below a British hedge

The first priorities for climate-friendly gardeners are therefore, to:

- Protect the soil's existing carbon stores;
- Increase the soil's carbon stores.
- Choose low-emission garden products and practices.
- Preventing erosion and keeping weeds down.
- Planting of trees and shrubs.
- By heat-trapping nitrous oxide emissions related to fertilizer use and generous watering.

To protect the soil, climate-friendly gardens:

- Are based on plants rather than buildings and paving;
- Have soil that is kept at a relatively stable temperature by shelter from trees, shrubs and/or hedges;
- Have soil that is always kept covered and therefore moist and at a relatively stable temperature by groundcover plants, fast-growing green manures (which can be used as an intercrop in kitchen gardens of annual vegetables) and/or organic mulches.

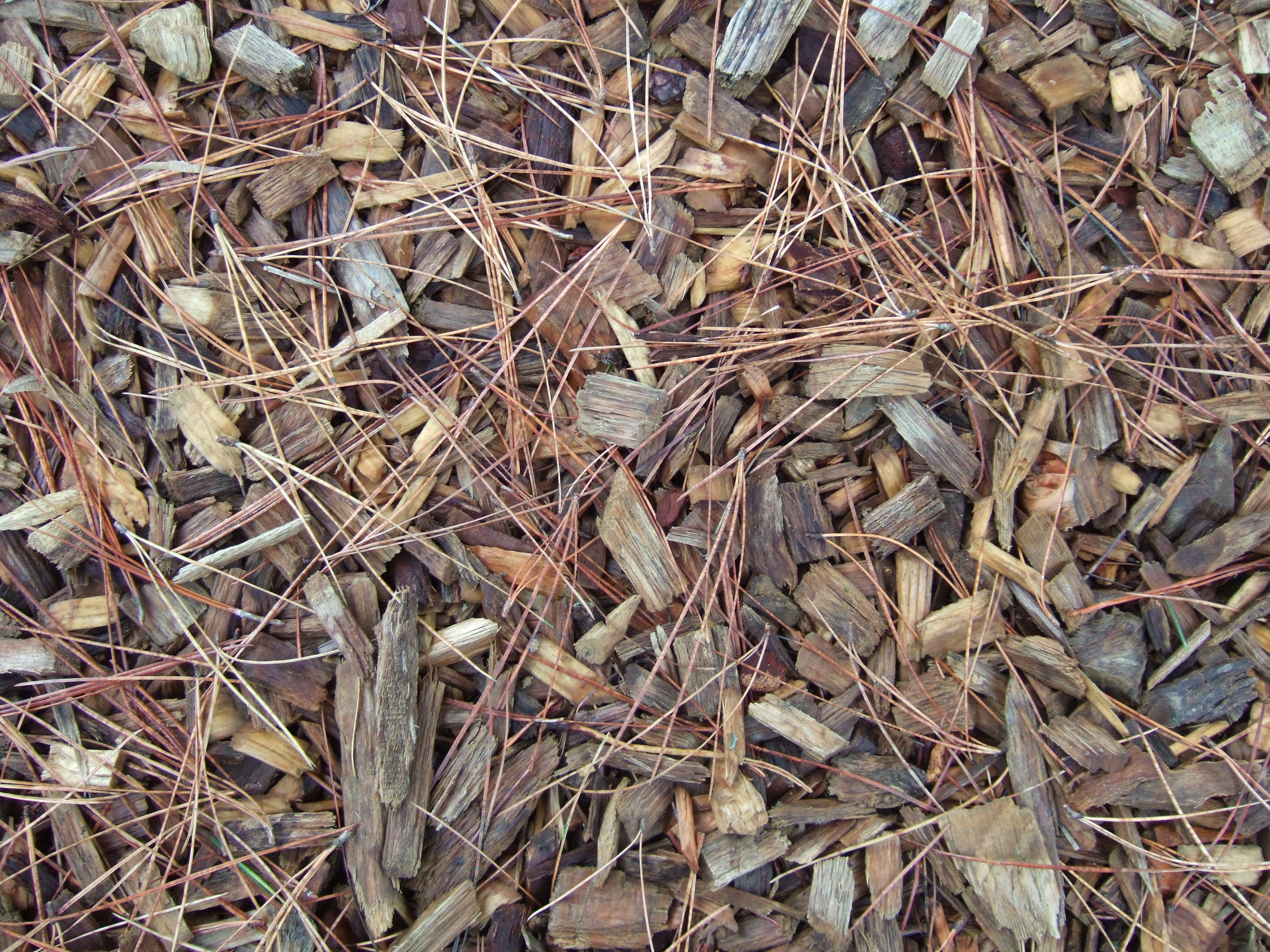
Mulch of woodchips protecting soil at the Royal Horticultural Society garden at Wisley in Surrey

Climate-friendly gardeners avoid things which may harm the soil. They do not tread on the soil when it is wet, because it is by then most vulnerable to compaction. They dig and till the soil as little as possible, and only when the soil is moist rather than wet, because cultivation increases the oxidation of soil organic matter and produces carbon dioxide.^{p. 54–55}

To increase soil carbon stores, climate-friendly gardeners ensure that their gardens create optimal conditions for various vigorous healthy growth of plants, and other garden organisms above and below the ground, and reduce the impact of any limiting factors.

In general, the more biomass that the plants can create each year, the more carbon at which will be added to the soil.^{p. 54–55} However, only some biomass each year becomes long-term soil carbon or humus. In Soil Carbon and Organic Farming, a 2009 report from the Soil Association, Gundula Azeez discusses several factors which increase how much biomass is turned into humus. These include good soil structure, soil organisms such as fine root hairs, microorganisms, mycorrhizas and earthworms which increases soil aggregation, residues from plants (such as trees and shrubs) which have a high level content of resistant chemicals such as lignin, and plant residues with a carbon to nitrogen ratio lower than about 32:1.

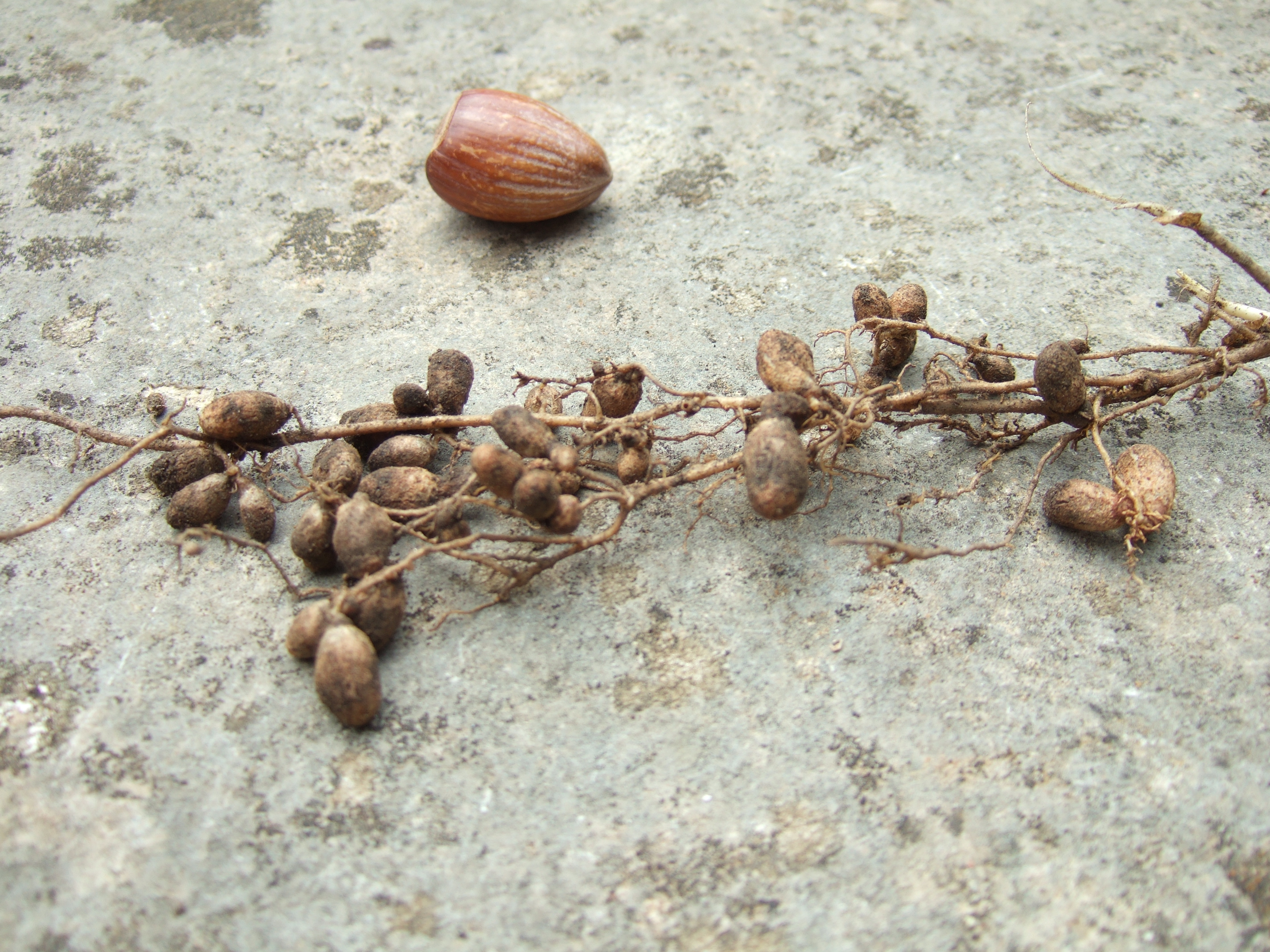
Nitrogen-fixing nodules on Wisteria roots (hazelnut for scale)

Climate-friendly gardens therefore include:

- Hedges for shelter from wind;
- A light canopy of late-leafing deciduous trees to let in enough sunlight for growth but not so much that the garden becomes too hot and dry (this is one of the principles behind many agroforestry systems, such as Paulownia's use in China partly because it is late-leafing and its canopy is sparse so that crops below it get shelter but also enough light);
- Groundcover plants and organic mulches (such as woodchips over compost made from kitchen and garden "waste") to keep soil moist and at relatively stable temperatures;
- Reducing the use of gas-powered lawn and garden equipment in favor of electric-powered devices. Instead of a leaf blower, using a rake or broom will cut down on gas emissions that contribute to climate change.
- Nitrogen-fixing plants, because soil nitrogen may be a limiting factor (but climate-friendly gardeners avoid synthetic nitrogen fertilizers, because these may cause mycorrhizal associations to break down);
- Many layers of plants, including woody plants such as trees and shrubs, other perennials, groundcover plants, deep-rooted plants, all chosen according to 'right plant, right place', so that they are suited to their growing conditions and will grow well;
- A wide diversity of disease-resistant, vigorous plants for resilience and to make the most of all available ecological niches;
- Plants to feed and shelter wildlife, to increase total biomass, and to ensure biological control of pests and diseases.
- Soil amendments from waste products such as compost made from garden and kitchen "waste" and biochar from pyrolyzed dried, dead wood.
- Maximise the ventilation and shading around the home as much as possible during the summer.

Lawns, like other grasslands, can build up good levels of soil carbon, but they will grow much more vigorously and store more carbon if besides grasses, they also contain nitrogen-fixing plants such as clover, and if they are cut down using a mulching mower which returns finely-chopped mowings to the lawn. More carbon, however, may be stored by other perennial plants such as trees and shrubs and they also do not need to be maintained using power tools.

Climate-friendly gardeners will also aim to increase biodiversity not only for the sake of the wildlife itself, but so that the garden ecosystem is resilient and more likely to store as much carbon as possible as long as possible. They will therefore avoid pesticides, and increase the diversity of the habitats within their gardens.

== Reducing greenhouse gas emissions ==
Climate-friendly gardeners can directly reduce the greenhouse gas emissions from their own gardens, but can also use their gardens to indirectly reduce greenhouse gas emissions elsewhere.

=== Using gardens to reduce greenhouse gas emissions ===
Climate-friendly gardeners can use their gardens in ways which reduce greenhouse gases elsewhere, for example by using the sun and wind to dry washing on washing lines in the garden instead of using electricity generated by fossil fuel to dry washing in tumble dryers.

==== From farmland ====
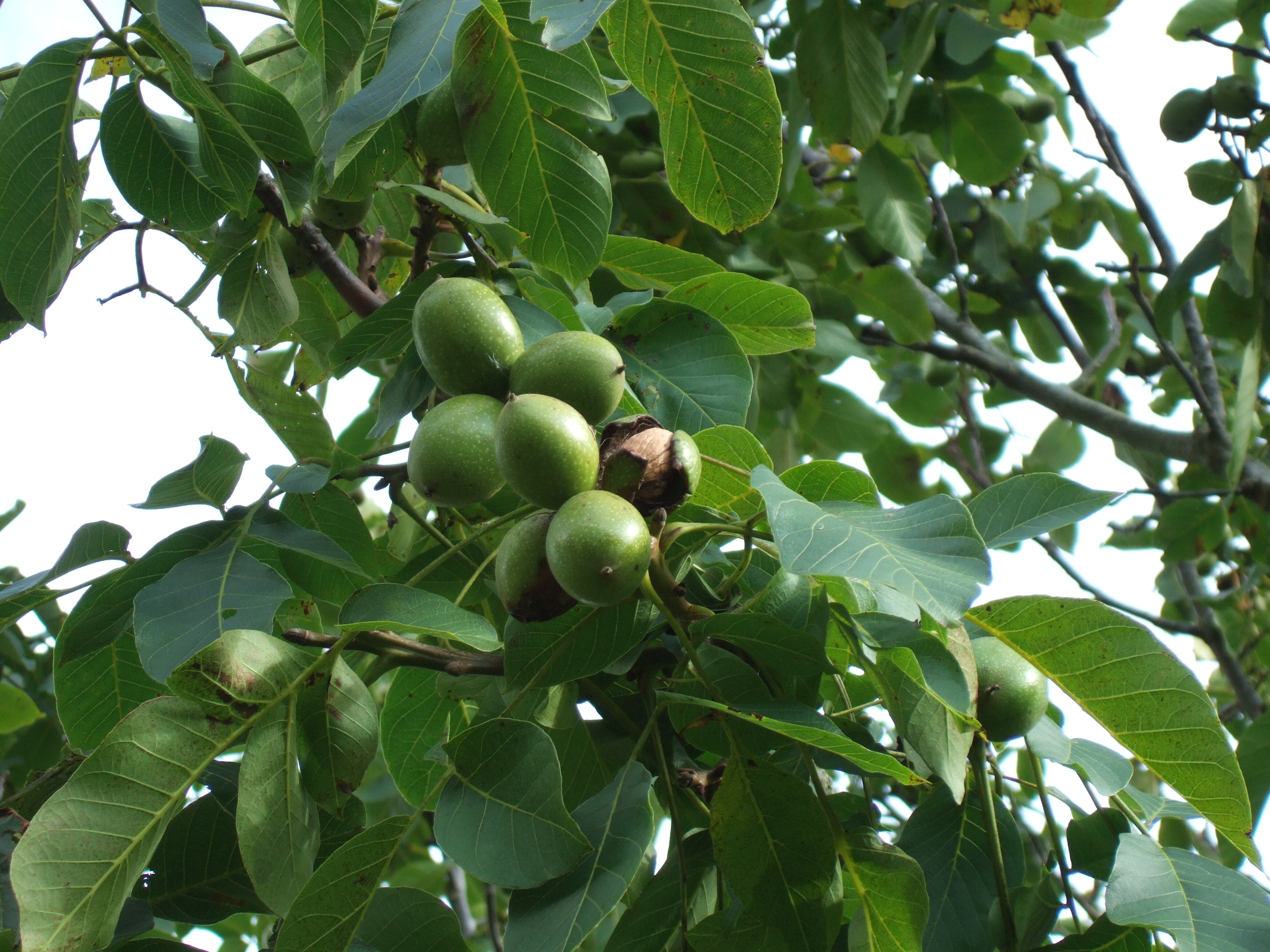
Walnut (Juglans regia) with ripening walnuts

Food is a major contributor to climate change. In the United Kingdom, according to Tara Garnett of the Food Climate Research Network, food contributes 19% of the country's greenhouse gas emissions.

Soil is the biggest store of carbon on land. It is therefore important to protect the soil organic matter in farmland. Farm animals; however, especially free-range pigs, may cause erosion, and also the cultivation of the soil increases the oxidation of soil organic matter into carbon dioxide. Other sources of greenhouse gases from farmland include: compaction caused by farm machinery or overgrazing by farm animals can make soil anaerobic and produce methane, which is emitted during the production and transport of coal, natural gas, and oil. Methane emissions also result from livestock and other agricultural practices, land use and by the decay of organic wastes in municipal solid waste landfills; farm animals produce methane; and nitrogen fertilizers can be converted to nitrous oxide which is also emitted during agricultural, land use, and industrial activities; combustion of fossil fuels and solid wastes; as well as during treatment of wastewater.

Most farmland consists of fields growing annual arable crops which are eaten directly by people or fed to farm animals, and grassland used as pasture, hay or silage to feed farm animals. Some perennial food plants are also grown, such as fruits and nuts in orchards, and watercress grown in water.

Although all cultivation of the soil in arable fields produces carbon dioxide, some arable crops cause more damage to soil than others. Root crops such as potatoes and sugar-beet, and crops which are harvested not just once a year but over a long period such as green vegetables and salads, are considered "high risk" in catchment-sensitive farming.

Climate-friendly gardeners therefore grow at least some of their food, and may choose food crops which therefore help to keep carbon in farmland soils if they grow such high-risk crops in small vegetable plots in their gardens, where it is easier to protect the soil than in large fields under commercial pressures. Climate-friendly gardeners may grow and eat plants such as sweet cicely which sweeten food, and so reduce the land area needed for sugar-beet. They may also choose to grow perennial food plants to not only reduce their indirect greenhouse gas emissions from farmland, but also to increase carbon stores in their own gardens.

Grassland contains more carbon per hectare than arable fields, but farm animals, especially ruminants such as cattle or sheep, produce large amounts of methane, directly and from manure heaps and slurry. Slurry and manure may also produce nitrous oxide. Gardeners who want to reduce their greenhouse gas emissions can help themselves to eat less meat and dairy produce by growing nut trees which are a good source of tasty, protein-rich food, including walnuts which are an excellent source of the omega-3 fatty acid alpha-linolenic acid.

Researchers and farmers are investigating and improving ways of farming which are more sustainable, such as agroforestry, forest farming, wildlife-friendly farming, soil management, catchment-sensitive farming (or water-friendly farming). For example, the organisation Farming Futures assists farmers in the United Kingdom to reduce their farms' greenhouse gas emissions.

Farmers are aware that consumers are increasingly asking for "green credentials". Gardeners who understand climate-friendly practices can advocate their use by farmers.

==== From industry ====
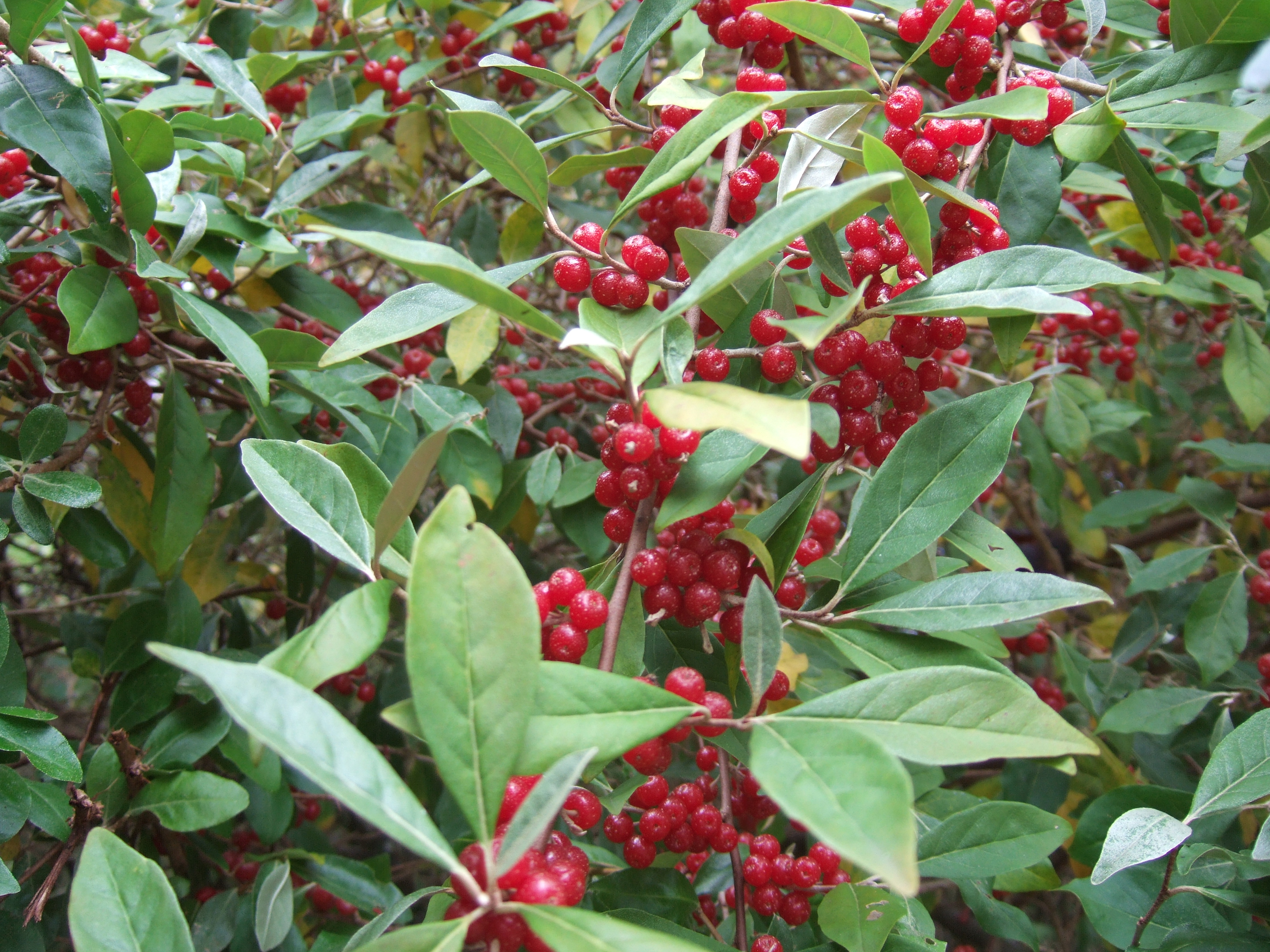
Nitrogen-fixing and edible - Elaeagnus umbellatus at the Agroforestry Research Trust forest garden in Devon

Climate-friendly gardeners aim to reduce their consumption in general. In particular, they try to avoid or reduce their consumption of tapwater because of the greenhouse gases emitted when fossil fuels are burnt to supply the energy needed to treat and pump it to them. Instead, gardeners can garden using only rainwater.

Greenhouse gases are produced in the manufacture of many materials and products used by gardeners. For example, it takes a lot of energy to produce synthetic fertilizers, especially nitrogen fertilizers. Ammonium nitrate, for example, has an embodied energy of 67,000 kilojoules/kilogramme, so climate-friendly gardeners will choose alternative ways of ensuring the soil in their gardens has optimal levels of nitrogen by alternative means such as nitrogen-fixing plants.

Climate-friendly gardeners will also aim to follow "cradle-to-cradle design" and "circular economy" principles: when they choose to buy or make something, it should be possible to take it apart again and recycle or compost every part, so that there is no waste, only raw materials to be made into something else. This will reduce the greenhouse gases otherwise produced when extracting raw materials.

==== From transport ====
Gardeners can reduce not only their food miles by growing some of their own food, but also their "gardening miles" by reducing the amount of plants and other materials they import, obtaining them as locally as possible and with as little packaging as possible. This might include ordering plants by mail order from a specialist nursery if the plants are sent out bare-root, reducing transport demand and the use of peat-based composts; or growing plants from seed, which will also increase genetic diversity and therefore resilience; or growing plants vegetatively from cuttings or offsets from other local gardeners; or buying reclaimed materials from salvage firms.

==== From houses ====
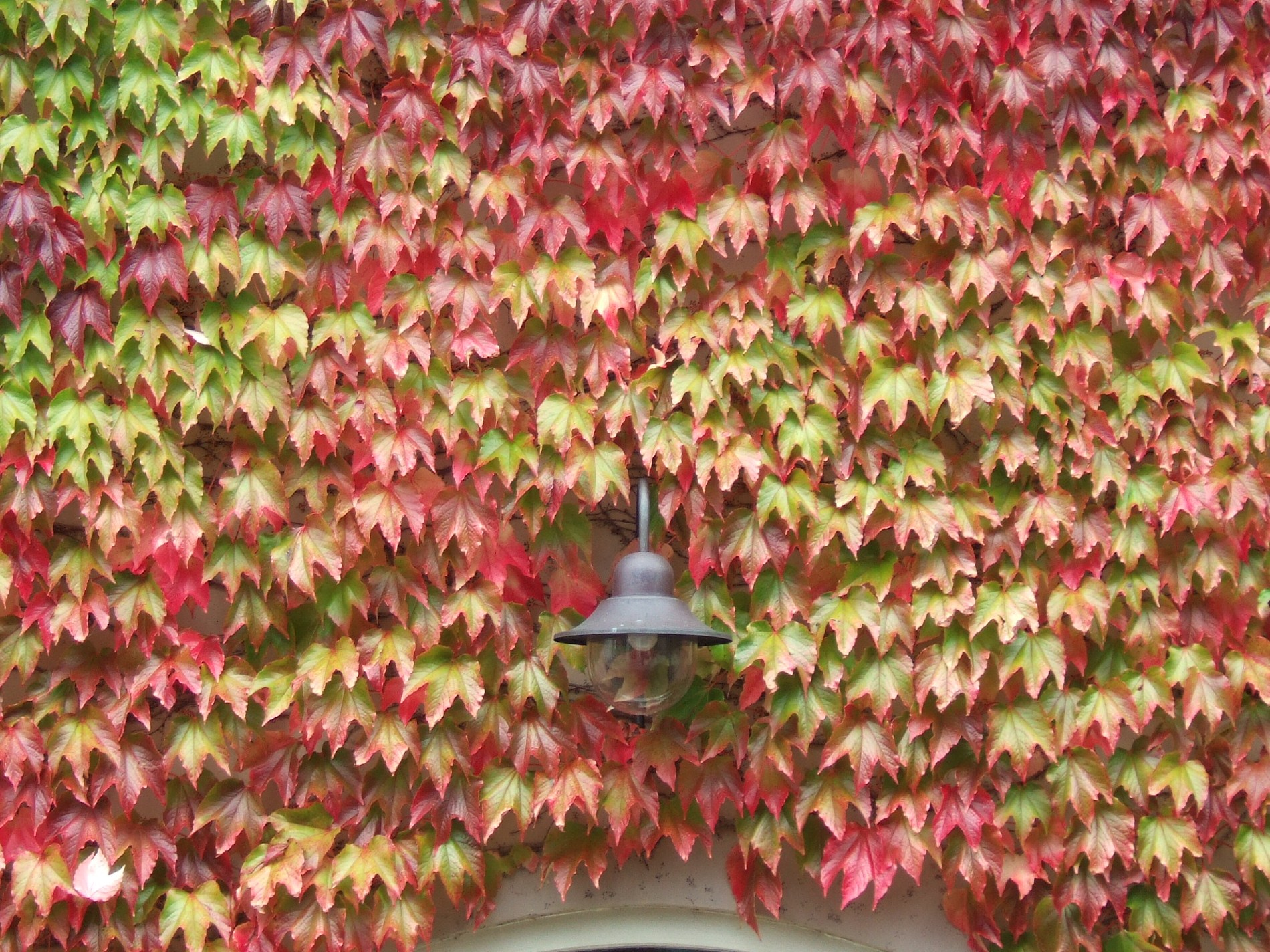
Climbers as insulation - Boston ivy (Parthenocissus tricuspidata), Boston ivy, in autumn

Climate-friendly gardeners can use their gardens in ways which reduce greenhouse gas emissions from homes by:

- Using sunlight and wind to dry washing on washing lines instead of fossil fuel-generated electricity to run tumble dryers;
- Planting deciduous climbers on houses and planting deciduous trees at suitable distances from the house to provide shade during the summer, reducing the consumption of electricity for air conditioning, but also such that at cooler times of year, sunlight can reach and warm a house, reducing heating costs and consumption;
- Planting hedges, trees, shrubs and climbers to shelter houses from wind, reducing heating costs and consumption during the winter (as long as any planting does not create a wind-tunnel effect).^{p. 243}

Climate-friendly gardeners may also choose to reduce their own personal greenhouse gas emissions by growing and eating carminative plants such as fennel and garlic which reduce intestinal gases such as methane.

=== Reducing greenhouse gas emissions from gardens and homes ===
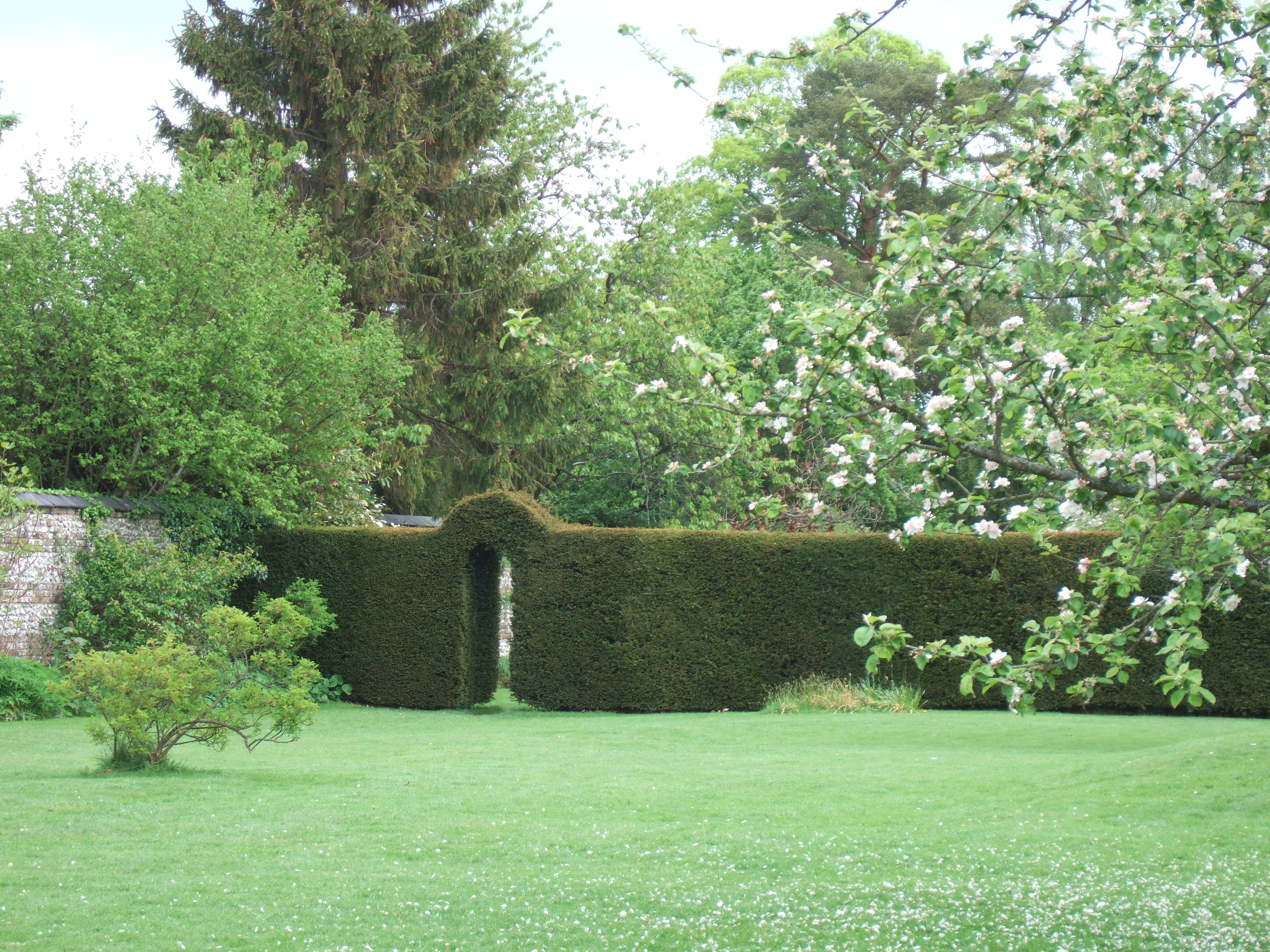
Slow-growing yew (Taxus baccata) as hedge at Charles Darwin's home, Down House, Kent

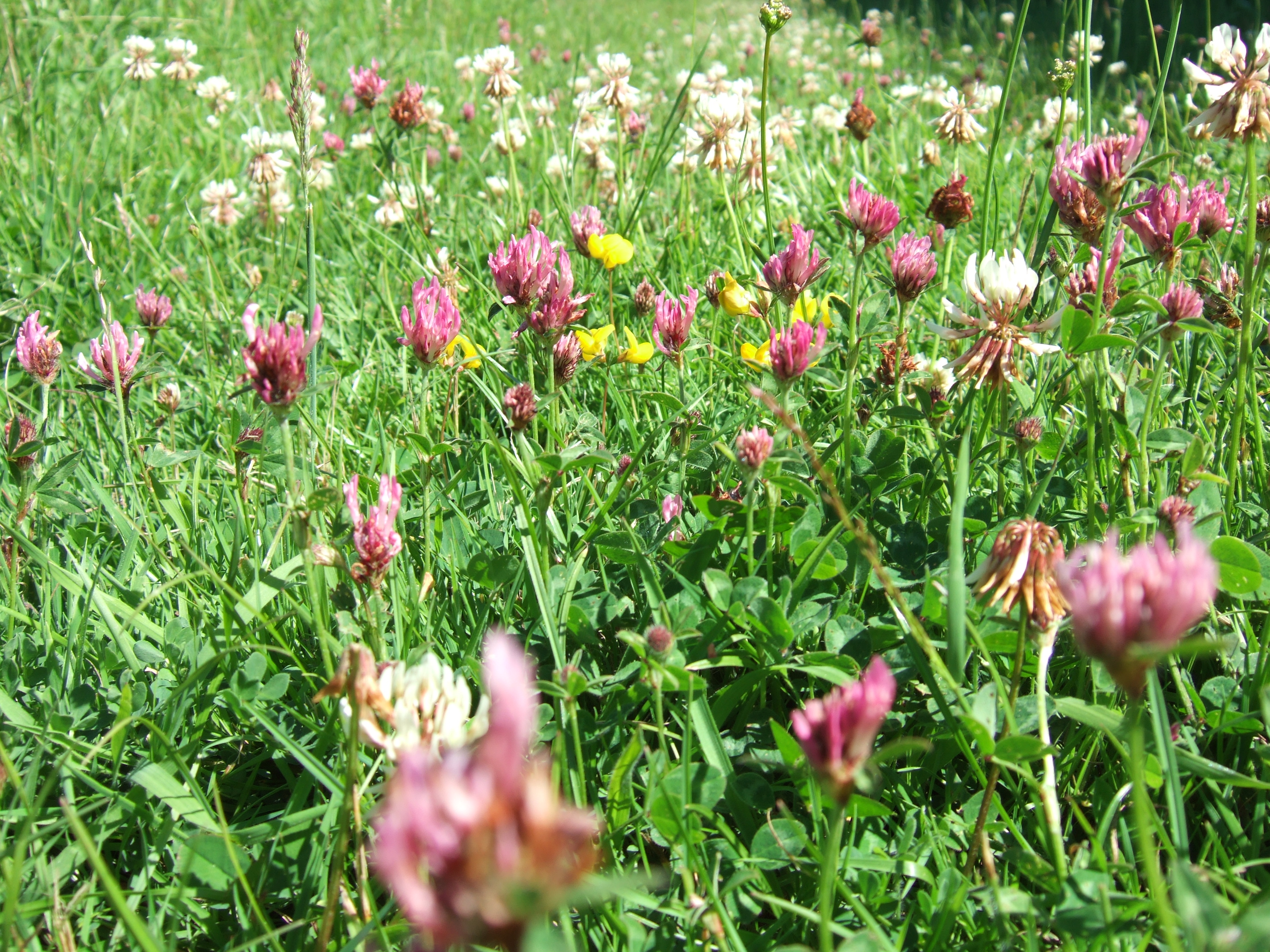
Nitrogen-fixing red and white clover (Trifolium) as lawn plants

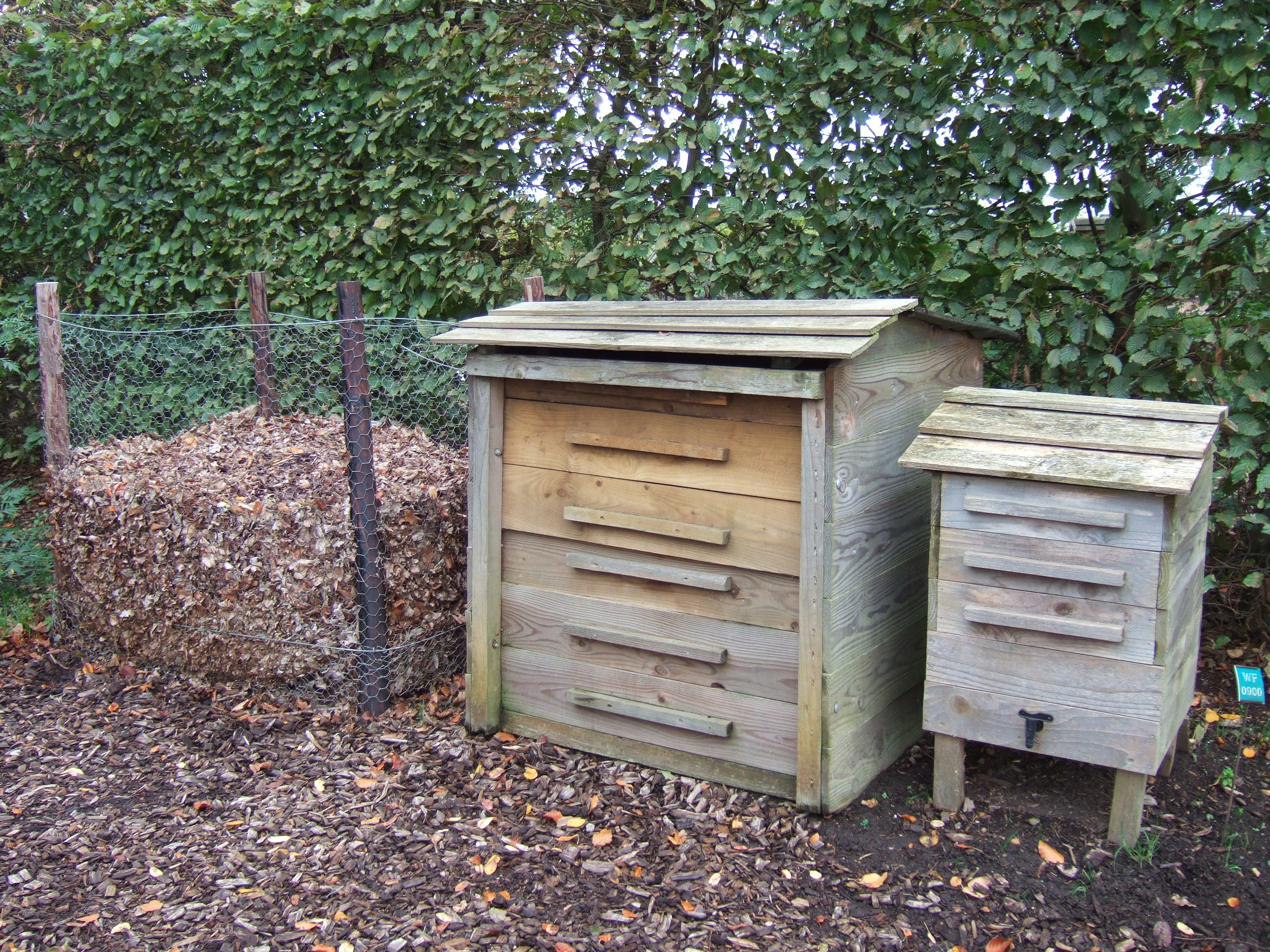
Leaf cage, compost heap and wormery at the Royal Horticultural Society garden at Wisley

There are some patent sources of greenhouse gas emissions in gardens and some more latent.

Power tools which are powered by diesel or petrol, or electricity generated by burning other fossil fuels, emit carbon dioxide. Climate-friendly gardeners may therefore choose to use hand tools rather than power tools, or power tools powered by renewable electricity, or design their gardens to reduce or remove a need to use power tools. For example, they may choose dense, slow-growing species for hedges so that the hedges only need to be cut once a year.

Turning one's thermostat equipment down to 3 degrees Fahrenheit in the winter and up to 3 degrees Fahrenheit in the summer will help reduce carbon dioxide emissions by about 1,050 pounds per year.

In place of a water-thirsty lawn that requires a lot of fertilizers and herbicides to be kept green and weed-free, native vegetation may be planted. This can be maintained with can a drip irrigation system to run by a "smart" sprinkler control. These "smart" sprinklers can determine whether it has rained recently and will not water the plants if it has. They are also system programmable relative to certain types of plants, as opposed to zones, so if certain plants need more water than others, they get it without drowning out other less water-loving plants.

Lawns are often cut by lawn mowers and, in drier parts of the world, are often irrigated by tapwater. Climate-friendly gardeners will therefore do what they can to reduce this consumption by:

- Replacing part of or all lawns with other perennial planting such as trees and shrubs with less ecologically demanding maintenance requirements;
- Cut some or all lawns only once or twice a year, i.e. convert them into meadows;
- Make lawn shapes simple so that they may be cut quickly;
- Increase the cutting height of mower blades;
- Use a mulching mower to return organic matter to the soil;
- Sow clover to increase vigour (without the need for synthetic fertilisers) and resilience in dry periods;
- Cut lawns with electric mowers using electricity from renewable energy;
- Cut lawns with hand tools such as push mowers or scythes.

Greenhouses can be used to grow crops which might otherwise be imported from warmer climates, but if they are heated by fossil fuel, then they may cause more greenhouse gas emissions than they save. Climate-friendly gardeners will therefore use their greenhouses carefully by:

- Choosing only annual plants which will only be in the greenhouse during warmer months, or perennial plants which do not need any extra heat during winter;
- Using water tanks as heat stores and compost heaps as heat sources inside greenhouses so that they stay frost-free in winter.

Climate-friendly gardeners will not put woody prunings on bonfires, which will emit carbon dioxide and black carbon due to the high oxygen content of such fires, but instead burn them indoors in a wood-burning stove and therefore cut emissions from fossil fuel, or cut them up to use as mulch and increase soil carbon stores, make biochar by pyrolysis, or add the smaller prunings to compost heaps to keep them aerated, reducing methane emissions. To reduce the risk of fire, they will also choose fire-resistant plants from habitats which are not prone to wildfires and which do not catch fire easily, rather than fire-adapted plants from fire-prone habitats, which are flammable and adapted to encourage fires and then gain a competitive advantage over less resistant species.

Climate-friendly gardeners may use deep-rooted plants such as comfrey to bring nutrients closer to the surface topsoil, but will do so without making the leaves into a liquid feed, because the rotting leaves in the anaerobic conditions under water may emit methane.

Nitrogen fertilizers may be oxidised to nitrous oxide, especially if fertilizer is applied in excess, or when plants are not actively growing. Climate-friendly gardeners may choose instead to use nitrogen-fixing plants which will add nitrogen to the soil without increasing nitrous oxide emissions.

== See also ==
- Agroforestry
- Energy-efficient landscaping
- Foodscaping
- Forest gardening
- Green building
- List of organic gardening and farming topics
- Natural landscaping
- Orchard
- Organic gardening
- Permaculture
- Rain garden
- Sustainable design / gardening / landscaping and landscape architecture / living
- Vegan organic gardening
- Water-wise gardening
- Wildlife gardening
