= Biology Letters =

- Discipline: Biology
- Language: English
- Edited by: Louise Heathwaite

Publication details
- History: 2005–present
- Publisher: Royal Society (United Kingdom)
- Frequency: Monthly
- Open access: Hybrid
- Impact factor: 2.7 (2025)

Standard abbreviations
- ISO 4: Biol. Lett.

Indexing
- CODEN: BLLUAZ
- ISSN: 1744-957X
- OCLC no.: 827741558

Links
- Journal homepage; Online access; Online archive

Biology Letters is a peer-reviewed scientific journal published by the Royal Society, established in 2005. It focuses on the rapid publication of short research articles, reviews, and opinion pieces across the biological sciences. The editor-in-chief is Louise Heathwaite FRS (Lancaster University).

== Contents ==
As well as conventional short research articles, the journal has recently published Special Features and Mini Series. Special Features are collections of up to 20 articles on a specific theme and published across multiple issues. Mini Series include up to six articles that are published in one issue.

== History ==
The journal was split off from the Proceedings of the Royal Society B: Biological Sciences in 2005 after having been published as a supplement. Originally it was published quarterly, then bimonthly, and since 2013 it has been published monthly. Printing ceased at the start of 2020.

== Abstracting and indexing ==
The journal is abstracted and indexed in:

- Biological Abstracts
- BIOSIS Previews
- CAB Abstracts
- Current Contents/Agriculture, Biology & Environmental Sciences
- Embase
- GEOBASE
- Index Medicus/MEDLINE/PubMed
- Répertoire International de Littérature Musicale
- Science Citation Index Expanded
- Scopus
- The Zoological Record

According to the Journal Citation Reports, the journal has a 2024 impact factor of 3.
