= Landmap =

Former spatial data download service

- Website type: Spatial Data Provider and E-learning Content
- Available in: English
- Owner: Funded by Joint Information Systems Committee (JISC)
- Creator: Mimas
- Website: landmap.mimas.ac.uk
- Registration: Yes (no subscription fee)
- Launched: Service Status 1 August 2007
- Current status: Discontinued 1 August 2013

Landmap was a service based at the University of Manchester, England, which provided UK academia with a free-of-charge spatial data download service, using Open Geospatial Consortium (OGC) standards for maximum interoperability, which was enhanced and supported by a range of teaching and learning materials. The service was hosted at the Mimas datacentre from 2007 until 2013, and was funded by the government via Jisc.

The spatial data and the learning materials are primarily for students, lecturers and researchers and can be accessed only through Shibboleth or Athens or similar UK university/institution authentication.

== End of service ==
Jisc funding for the Landmap service terminated on 31 December 2013.

The Landmap data purchased by Jisc have been transferred to NERC's Centre for Environmental Data Analysis (CEDA) and can be accessed from there. The Learning Zone hosted by Landmap can be accessed on the Landmap Legacy site.

== History ==
The Landmap Project began late 1999 as a joint project between Mimas, UCL Department of Geomatic Engineering, and other project partners. The project produced orthorectified satellite image mosaics of Landsat, SPOT and ERS radar data and a high resolution Digital Elevation Model (DEM) for the British Isles. The DEM was quality assured using a Kinematic Global Positioning Survey (KGPS). The outputs of the Landmap Project were provided as a basic download service to the UK and Irish academic community.

The Landmap Service followed a JISC subscription-based model for service cost recovery between August 2004 and July 2007. In 2005 Landmap obtained an agreement with the European Space Agency to provide ENVISAT Advanced Synthetic Radar (ASAR) data to the UK academic community through the Category 1 Project 'Monitoring the UK with ENVISAT ASAR and MERIS'. During this time a pre-processing chain was developed to provide orthorectified GeoTIFF ASAR data and to deliver this data through the Landmap website. In 2007 Landmap presented the work done as part of the Category 1 Project at the biannual ESA Fringe Workshop. In 2006 the Image Processing Course for Erdas, ENVI, IDRISI Kilimanjaro and PCI Geomatica was released onto the Landmap website. The course materials were authored by IS Limited and access was protected using Athens.

The Landmap service was awarded five years' funding by Jisc from 1 August 2007, which removed the subscription element of the service and allowed for a modest budget for data acquisition and some e-learning content creation. This allowed all members of the academic community to obtain spatial data from the service free of charge, making the size and quantity of users for an academic institution irrelevant in terms of accessing spatial data.

New data acquisitions included the Cities Revealed datasets provided by The GeoInformation Group and colour infrared data from Bluesky. During this time there was also an agreement with Infoterra for tasking the TopSat satellite with requests by the UK academic community for images practically anywhere in the world. These images obtained by TopSat were provided on the Landmap website and displayed in Google Earth.

Landmap started to work with e-learning technology company Telaman to help create a pedagogy for the new Learning Zone area of the website. New e-learning content was sought from the academic and commercial spatial science community. The Learning Zone expanded greatly in 2008/2009 with new content provided by The GeoInformation Group and lecturers from the academic community.

== Conference papers ==
1. Millin-Chalabi, G., Schumm, J., Gupta, B., Tun, Y., Kandeh, J. and Kitmitto, K. (2011), Bournemouth University, UK
2. Millin, G. and et al. (2009) RSPSoc Annual Conference 2009, University of Leicester, UK.
