= IESR =

The JISC Information Environment Service Registry (IESR) provides a registry of all "significant research collections in the UK" and supports "teaching, learning and research". It is funded by the Jisc under its Shared Infrastructure Services programme.

The IESR aims to provide a “Yellow Pages for the academic internet” accessible through web and machine interfaces. It provides a reliable source of information that other applications, such as portals, can freely access through machine-to-machine protocols, in order to help their end users discover resources of assistance to them.

IESR contains information about the resources themselves, technical details about how to access the resources, and contact details for the resource providers.

IESR is a Mimas service based at the University of Manchester.
