= Mimas (data centre) =

Former academic data centre in England

Mimas was a nationally designated academic data centre based at the University of Manchester in England. Its mission was to support the advancement of knowledge, research and teaching. It hosted a number of the UK's research information assets – and built applications to help people access this resource. The organisation had a long-standing relationship with Jisc, and strong connections with research councils, especially the Economic and Social Research Council. Mimas was transferred to Jisc in August 2014 (11 years ago).

Mimas services included Copac, Archives Hub, Intute, ISI Web of Knowledge, Zetoc, IESR, Census Dissemination Unit, CrossFire (Beilstein & Gmelin), ESDS International, Landmap, Hairdressing Training, Jorum, JSTOR and UK PubMed Central.

== See also ==
- Archives Hub
- Copac
- ESDS International
- IESR
- Intute
- Europe PubMed Central
- Landmap
