= Edinburgh Engineering Virtual Library =

Edinburgh Engineering Virtual Library (EEVL) project was started in August 1995 and the core database went live in September 1996. Its objective was to provide a free guide to specialist engineering resources to UK higher education institutions. It focused primarily on UK based resources. It was part of the Electronic Libraries Programme (eLib) which was funded by the Joint Information Systems Committee (JISC) The main team was based at Heriot Watt University in Edinburgh, with additional input from staff at the University of Edinburgh, Imperial College, Cambridge University, Nottingham Trent University, Sheffield University, Cranfield University and the IEE.

Resources were classified using a scheme based on Ei codes. An abstract and keywords were also provided for each item. The main subject classifications used were: Aerospace & Defence Engineering, Bioengineering, Chemical Engineering, Civil Engineering, Electrical, Electronic and Computer Engineering, Engineering General, Engineering Design, Environmental Engineering, Manufacturing Engineering, Materials Engineering, Mechanical Engineering and Related Industries, Mining, Nanotechnology, Petroleum & Offshore Engineering. As the number of resources increased these headings were divided into subheadings as necessary.

EEVL also classified resources by type. The types used were: Commercial, Society/Institution, Higher Education, Resource Guide/Directory, E-journal/Newsletter, Governmental, Document, Research Project/Centr, Mailing/Discussion List, Software, Database/Databank, Training Materials, Reference, Recruitment/Employment, Patents/Standards, Conference/Meeting Announcements, Frequently Asked Questions, Video, Library Catalogues

EEVL also provided additional services such as a search engine for electronic journals, EESE.

In 1999 the project expanded to become an Engineering, Mathematics and Computing (EMC) Hub as part of the Resource Discovery Network.

In 2006 it became Intute Engineering as the RDN Hubs merged to form Intute.
