= Intute =

British educational website

Intute was a free Web service aimed at students, teachers, and researchers in UK further education and higher education. Intute provided access to online resources, via a large database of resources. Each resource was reviewed by an academic specialist in the subject, who wrote a short review of between 100 and 200 words, and described via various metadata fields (such as which subject discipline(s) it would be useful to) what type of resource it was, who created it, who its intended audience was, what time-period or geographical area the resource covered, and so on. As of July 2010, Intute provided 123,519 records. Funding was stopped in 2011, and the site closed.

A partial archive of the Intute library is maintained at XtLearn.net

== History of Intute ==
Intute was formed in July 2006 after the merger of the eight semi-autonomous "hubs" that formed the Resource Discovery Network (RDN). These hubs each served particular academic disciplines:

- Altis - Hospitality, leisure, sport and tourism
- Artifact - Arts and creative industries
- Biome - Health and life sciences
- EEVL - Engineering, mathematics, and computing
- GEsource - Geography and the environment
- Humbul - Humanities
- PSIgate - Physical sciences
- SOSIG - Social sciences

The restructuring and rebranding was undertaken to create a service with a more uniform identity and appearance, better cross-searching facilities, and more focused technical and management teams. As part of the restructuring, the eight RDN hubs were initially reorganised into four subject groups. This process also incorporated the Virtual Training Suite , a series of continually updated, free online Internet training tutorials for over 65 subject areas.

The Intute service was geographically distributed, with staff based at several UK universities.

- University of Birmingham
- University of Bristol
- Heriot-Watt University
- University of Manchester
- Manchester Metropolitan University
- University of Nottingham
- University of Oxford
- University College Birmingham

In July 2010, funding for Intute was significantly reduced and the Consortium was disbanded. Intute was then maintained by Mimas at the University of Manchester, and the Virtual Training Suite was maintained and developed by the Institute for Learning and Research Technology (ILRT) at the University of Bristol.

The Intute.ac.uk service ended July 2011. The educational social bookmarking service XtLearn.net now maintains an unofficial archive of the majority of the Intute content set.

== Funding ==
Intute was funded by the Joint Information Systems Committee (JISC). Some of the subject groups received funding from the Arts and Humanities Research Council (AHRC) and the Economic and Social Research Council (ESRC). The Wellcome Trust was a partner of Intute: Health and Life Sciences and contributed content to this section.

In 2010, funding from Jisc was significantly reduced, and ceased in August 2011. In July of that year Intute stopped updating and actively maintaining the site. It remained available on the Internet without maintenance for three years beyond that. Intute looked for ways to fold its content into some other service but none were found.

== Functionality ==
Intute's online database could be searched or browsed using a standard Web browser. The database contained 123,519 records (July 2010). Old records were reviewed regularly by subject experts to ensure that information was as current as possible. The advanced search engine enabled users to search the database by keyword, subject, or resource type, whilst the browse structure enabled time period and resource type filtering, as well as the ability to restrict searches to within particular browse headings.

The Intute Integration tools enabled users to customise and export Intute content to their own web pages or VLEs. This included newsfeeds, an embedded search box and MyIntute (where users could save Intute content in their own online space, tag and export it). Machine-readable interfaces to the database were available using the Z39.50, Search/Retrieve Web Service and OAI-PMH protocols.

== Awards ==
Intute was awarded the 2007 Jason Farradane Award in recognition of its outstanding work in the field of information science. The award was made on behalf of the UK eInformation Group (UKeiG), part of the Chartered Institute of Library and Information Professionals (CILIP). It is sponsored by the Journal of Information Science, published by SAGE Publications.
