= David Carson (climatologist) =

British climatologist

David John Carson is a climatologist. He has been director of the Hadley Centre (around 1990-1996), director of Numerical Weather Prediction at the UKMO (around 1999-2000), and was director of the World Climate Research Programme from 2000 to 2005.

Carson joined the UK Meteorological Office in 1969, following his PhD from the Department of Applied Mathematics, University of Liverpool, working on the structure and evolution of the atmospheric boundary layer. He did early research on the development of atmospheric general circulation models. In 1982, he was appointed to assistant director within the Met Office, and led the Boundary Layer Research Branch and later the Dynamical Climatology Branch. For 1987–1989 Carson was seconded to the Natural Environment Research Council (NERC) as their first Programme Director for atmospheric sciences. He returned to the Met. Office in January 1990 and became Director of Climate Research and then first director of the Hadley Centre.
