= Natural Environment Research Council =

British research council

Council overview
- Formed: 1965; 61 years ago
- Status: Council within UK Research and Innovation
- Headquarters: Swindon, Wiltshire, England
- Annual budget: £320 million (FY2024/25)
- Ministers responsible: Jonathan Reynolds MP, Secretary of State for Business, Innovation, Science and Trade; Chris McDonald MP, Minister of State for Science, Innovation, Research and Nuclear
- Council executives: Anthony Cleaver, Chairman; Louise Heathwaite, Executive Chair
- Parent department: Department for Science, Innovation and Technology
- Parent body: UK Research and Innovation
- Website: www.ukri.org/councils/nerc

The Natural Environment Research Council (NERC) is a council of UK Research and Innovation (UKRI), a non-departmental public body sponsored by the Department for Science, Innovation and Technology, responsible for supporting research, training and knowledge transfer activities in the environmental sciences.

== History ==
NERC began in 1965 when several environmental (mainly geographic) research organisations (including Nature Conservancy which became the Nature Conservancy Council in 1973 and was divided up in 1991) were brought under the one umbrella organisation. When most research councils were re-organised in 1994, it had new responsibilities – Earth observation and science-developed archaeology. Collaboration between research councils increased in 2002 when Research Councils UK was formed.

=== Chief executives ===
- Sir Graham Sutton (1965–1970)
- Professor James William Longman Beament (succeeding V. C. Wynne-Edwards; 1978–1981)
- Professor John Krebs, Baron Krebs (1994–1999)
- Sir John Lawton (1999–2005)
- Professor Alan Thorpe (2005–2011)
- Dr Steven Wilson (Acting; 2011–2012)
- Professor Duncan Wingham (2012–2024)
- Professor Louise Heathwaite (March 2024–present)

== Organisational structure ==
The council's head office is at Polaris House in Swindon, alongside the other six Research Councils. NERC's research centres provide leadership to the UK environmental science community and play significant and influential roles in international science collaborations.

Insignia	Organisation
	British Antarctic Survey
	British Geological Survey
	National Centre for Atmospheric Science
	National Centre for Earth Observation
	National Oceanography Centre (1996–2019)
	Centre for Ecology and Hydrology (1994–2019)

It also supports a number of collaborative centres of excellence and subject-based designated Environmental Data Centres for the storage and distribution of environmental data.

== Mission ==
The Natural Environment Research Council delivers independent research, survey, training and knowledge transfer in the environmental sciences, to advance knowledge of planet Earth as a complex, interacting system. The council's work covers the full range of atmospheric, Earth, biological, terrestrial and aquatic sciences, from the deep oceans to the upper atmosphere, and from the geographical poles to the equator.

NERC's mission is to gather and apply knowledge, create understanding and predict the behaviour of the natural environment and its resources, and communicate all aspects of the council's work. The British Meteorological Office is not part of NERC.

== NERC Airborne Research Facility ==
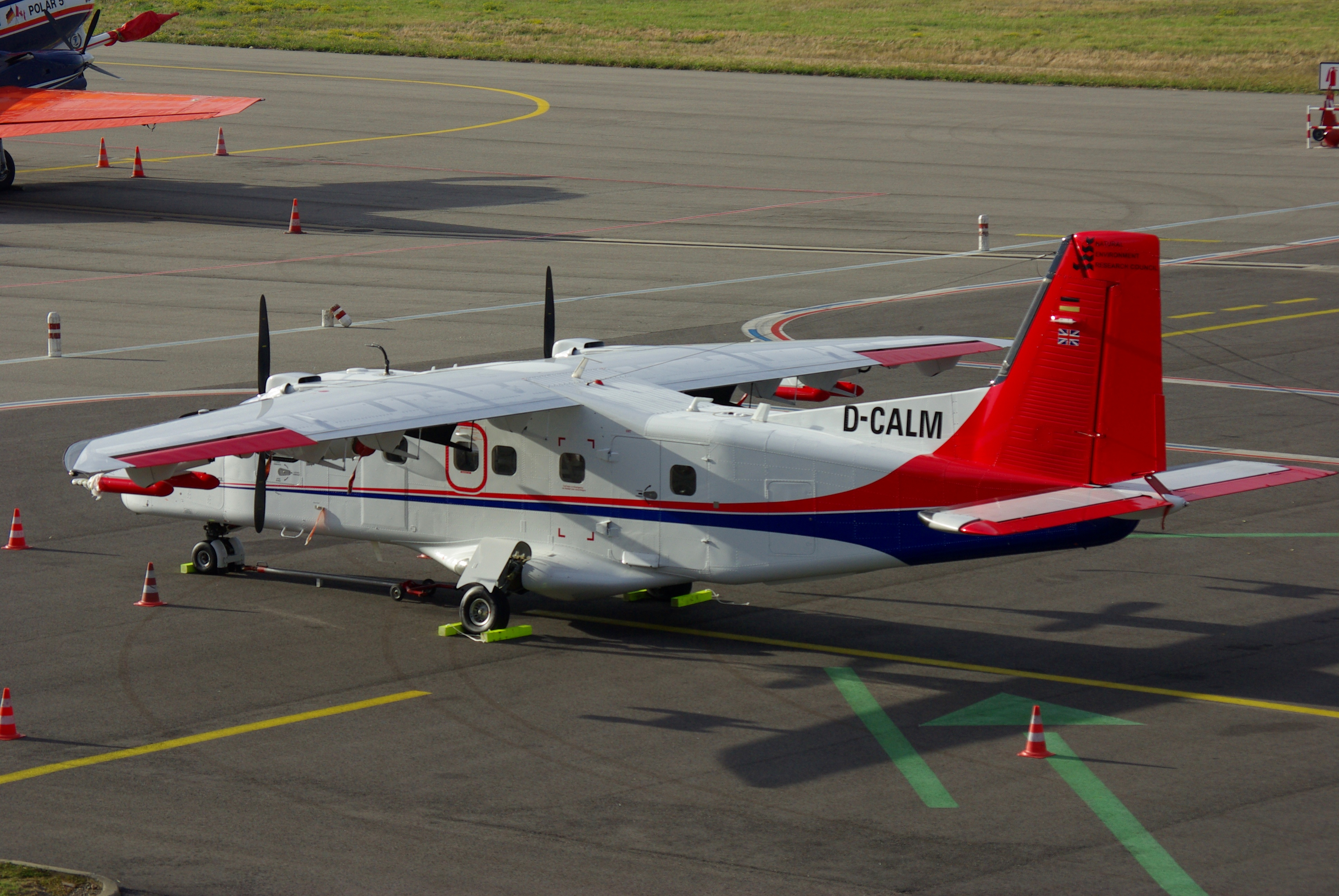
The Dornier Do 228 of the Natural Environment Research Council registered D-CALM.

The NERC Airborne Research Facility (ARF) collects and processes remotely sensed data for use by the scientific community. Data are collected from one of four Twin Otter research aircraft (or a Dash 7) operated by British Antarctic Survey, processed by a data analysis team at the Plymouth Marine Laboratory and archived at the National Earth Observation Data Centre (NEODC). Currently the NERC ARF provides radiometrically corrected hyperspectral data from the AISA Fenix and Owl instruments; ground height information from the Leica ALS50-II; and digital photography.

== See also ==
- Conservation biology – Study of threats to biological diversity
- Conservation ethic – Movement to protect the biosphere
- Conservation movement – Sociopolitical advocacy for protecting natural resources
- David Carson (climatologist) – British climatologist
- Ecology – Study of organisms and their environment
- Ecology movement – Movement for addressing environmental issues
- Environmentalism – Philosophy about Earth protection
- Environmental movement – Movement for addressing environmental issues
- Environmental protection – Practice of protecting the natural environment
- Habitat conservation – Management practice for protecting types of environments
- List of environmental organisations
- Natural environment – Living and non-living things on Earth
- Natural capital – World's stock of natural resources
- Natural resource – Resources that exist without actions of humankind
- Renewable resource – Natural resource that is replenished relatively quickly
- Royal Research Ship – Scientific research vessel of the United Kingdom
- Sustainable development – Mode of human development
- Sustainability – Societal goal and normative concept
