= Louise Heathwaite =

British hydrochemist

Louise Heathwaite CBE FRS FRSE

Pro-Vice-Chancellor (Research and Enterprise) Lancaster University
- Incumbent
- Assumed office 1 July 2021
- Scientific career
- Education: University of East Anglia; University of Bristol
- Fields: Hydrochemistry
- Workplaces: University of Sheffield; Lancaster University

Ann Louise Heathwaite is a British environmental scientist. She is Distinguished Professor in the Lancaster Environment Centre at Lancaster University and Pro-Vice-Chancellor of Research and Enterprise. She is a hydrochemist working on diffuse environmental pollution, especially the pathways of nitrogen and phosphorus loss from agricultural land to water.

In 2004 she was elected as vice-president of the International Association of Hydrological Sciences (IAHS). In 2015, she was elected a Fellow of the Royal Society of Edinburgh in recognition of the distinguished contribution she has made to catchment science and to science-policy engagement. In 2017 Heathwaite became the first woman to be elected President of the Freshwater Biological Association (FBA).

In July 2021 Heathwaite accepted a ministerial appointment as Chair of the Department for Environment, Food and Rural Affairs (Defra) Science Advisory Council, which provides expert advice to the ’Defra Chief Scientific Adviser and helps guide Defra’s scientific priorities and planning. In April 2022 she was appointed to the UK Cabinet Office's Geospatial Commission as an independent commissioner. She was Chief Scientific Adviser to the Scottish Government on Rural Affairs, Food and the Environment from 2012-2017 and was a Council member (ex-officio) on the Natural Environment Research Council (NERC) from 2012-2017, prior to being appointed to the new UK Research and Innovation (UKRI) NERC Council from 2018-2021. Heathwaite served on Defra's Science Advisory Council from 2011-17 and was its chair from 2019-2021. In December 2023 she was appointed as the Executive Chair of NERC.

Heathwaite was awarded a CBE in the Queen's Birthday honours 2018 for services to scientific research and scientific advice to government. On receiving the honour she said, “I love trying to work out what makes things tick and working independently, so research was the only career for me. More so, I want science to be useful and I have been very lucky to have had the opportunity to show how science can help with government policy.”

== Career and research ==
Heathwaite graduated with a 1st Class Honours degree in Environmental Science from the University of East Anglia in 1982 and was awarded a PhD on Wetland Hydrochemistry from the University of Bristol in 1987.

Heathwaite joined the Department of Geography at the University of Sheffield in 1990 becoming Professor in 1998. In 2004 she moved to Lancaster University to set up and Direct the interdisciplinary Centre for Sustainable Water Management that would eventually become part of the Lancaster Environment Centre. In 2018, she was appointed Cross-Faculty Associate Dean for Research at Lancaster University and was appointed Pro-Vice-Chancellor (Research and Enterprise) in 2019.

A key element of Heathwaite's research is the concept of Critical Source Areas which can be modelled to evaluate diffuse pollution risk. These models have been used in creating water policy including the EU Water Framework Directive, Defra's Catchment Sensitive Farming project and the work of The Rivers Trust). Heathwaite held a position on the Board of Trustees of the Eden River Trust from 2008 to 2012.

Heathwaite chaired an independent review for the Scottish Funding Council of the Scottish research pooling initiative which reported its results in September 2019.

== Honours and recognition ==
In 2004 she was elected as vice-president of the International Association of Hydrological Sciences (IAHS).

In 2015 she was elected a Fellow of the Royal Society of Edinburgh (RSE).

In 2017 she was elected President of the Freshwater Biological Association (FBA).

Heathwaite was appointed a Commander of the Order of the British Empire (CBE) in the 2018 Birthday Honours for services to scientific research and scientific advice to government.

In 2023 she was elected a Fellow of the Royal Society (FRS) in recognition of her sustained scholarship in environmental science, her outstanding contribution to science leadership, and her highly valued expertise in translating science to policy and impacts.

== Publications ==
Publications include:

- Gburek, W. J., Sharpley, A.N., Heathwaite, A. L. and Folmar, G. (2000) Phosphorus management at the watershed scale. Journal of Environmental Quality 29: 130–44. doi: 10.2134/jeq2000.00472425002900010017x
- Heathwaite, A. L. and Dils, R. M. (2000) Characterising phosphorus loss in surface and subsurface hydrological pathways. Science of the Total Environment 251: 523–38. doi: 10.1016/S0048-9697(00)00393-4
- Heathwaite, A. L., Sharpley, A. N. & Gburek, W. J. (2000) A conceptual approach for integrating phosphorus and nitrogen management at watershed scales. Journal of Environmental Quality 29: 158–166. doi: 10.2134/jeq2000.00472425002900010020x
- Heathwaite, A. L. Quinn, P. F. and Hewett, C. J. M. (2005) Modelling and managing critical source areas of diffuse pollution from agricultural land using flow connectivity simulation. Journal of Hydrology 304: 446–461. doi: 10.1016/j.jhydrol.2004.07.043
- Haygarth, P. M., Condron, L., Heathwaite, A. L., Turner B. & Harris, G. P. (2005) The phosphorus transfer continuum. Science of the Total Environment 344(1–3): 5–14. doi: 10.1016/j.scitotenv.2005.02.001
