= NERC Data Centres =

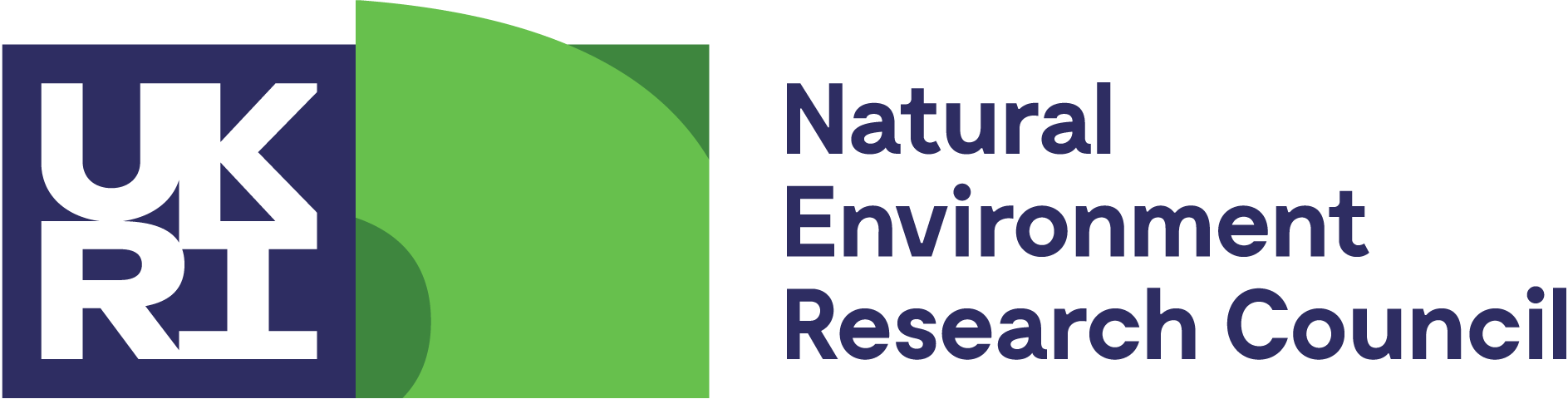

The Natural Environment Research Council (NERC) has seven subject-based environmental data centres (EDCs) to store and distribute data from its own research programes and data that are of general use to the environmental research community. These data centres are sometimes called the NERC designated Data Centres.

== Data Centres ==
The NERC Environmental Data Centres and their areas of responsibility are as follows:

- British Oceanographic Data Centre – Marine Science
- Centre for Environmental Data Analysis (CEDA), joint responsibility with Science and Technology Facilities Council which include:
  - British Atmospheric Data Centre – Atmospheric Science
  - NERC Earth Observation Data Centre – Earth Observation
  - UK Solar System Data Centre – Solar terrestrial physics (Earth Orientated)
- Environmental Information Data Centre – Terrestrial & Freshwater Science, part of the Centre for Ecology and Hydrology
- National Geoscience Data Centre (NGDC) – Earth Sciences – part of British Geological Survey
- Polar Data Centre (UK PDC) – Polar Science – British Antarctic Survey

The data centres hold data from environmental scientists working in the UK and around the world. They provide access to a comprehensive data and information resource about our environment, through the NERC Data Catalog Service. As of 2018 CEDA hosts the NERC Data Catalog Service, data may also be cataloged from certain NERC Data Centres and also at data.gov.uk. Access to these data is freely available to students, researchers and stakeholders, as well as business users and policy makers, to help them understand the environment in which we live.

Each data centre works to build user confidence, using common data formats and noting sources, contexts, and degrees of accuracy. They combine expertise in the scientific collection of information, state-of-the-art data management and preservation techniques, making them an important national asset.

== NERC Data Policy ==
The NERC Data Policy is commitment to support the long-term management of environmental data and also outlines the roles and responsibilities of all those involved in collecting and managing environmental data. The NERC Data Centres provide support and guidance in data management to those funded by NERC, are responsible for the long-term management of data and provide access to NERC's holdings of environmental data.

The Data Policy is consistent with legal frameworks, such as the Environmental Information Regulations 2004, the INSPIRE Regulations 2009 and contractual arrangements with other bodies where, for example, NERC holds data on their behalf but does not own the intellectual property rights.

To reflect NERC's continuing commitment to openness and transparency in the research process, and in support of the government's developing agenda on open access to public data, the NERC Data Policy has been substantially revised, and this new version of NERC's Data Policy came into force in January 2011.

=== Charging policy ===
The NERC charging regime recognizes two classes of data:

1. Raw or unrefined – these are data collected (or held) by NERC, with any necessary quality assurance or post processing applied, and used to deliver NERC's public function;
2. Value added or refined – these are data where an extra level of intellectual input has been added, for example, by combining a number of data sets together, or producing an information product by the interpretation of a number of data sets, and crucially, is above and beyond what is required to deliver NERC's public function.

The license charges that NERC can levy for the supply of data and information are governed by HM Treasury guidance and Government regulations. During 2010 NERC aimed to move to a position where it will supply its data for free for all teaching and research activities, apart from large or complex requests where they may make a nominal handling charge.

== Science Information Strategy ==
The NERC Science Information Strategy (SIS) was created to provide the framework for NERC to work more closely and effectively with its scientific communities, both internal and external, in delivering data and information management services to support its five-year science strategy, the Next Generation Science for Planet Earth 2007–2012.

The Science Information Strategy is being implemented in three phases, beginning April 2010. Each of these phases will be made up of a number of smaller projects. Project/Phase 1 will concentrate on determining user requirements, documenting existing holdings, agreeing an information architecture, updating the NERC Data Policy and improving the data discovery tools.

The benefits of the SIS implementation for science include the increased competence of data centre staff to inform the science community, policy and decision makers nationally and internationally on best practice, standards development and the establishment of new projects and initiatives (e.g. EU Framework projects): enhancing NERC's national and international reputation and increased capability to conduct multi-disciplinary, integrated science.
