= Catchment Sensitive Farming =

UK sustainable agriculture program

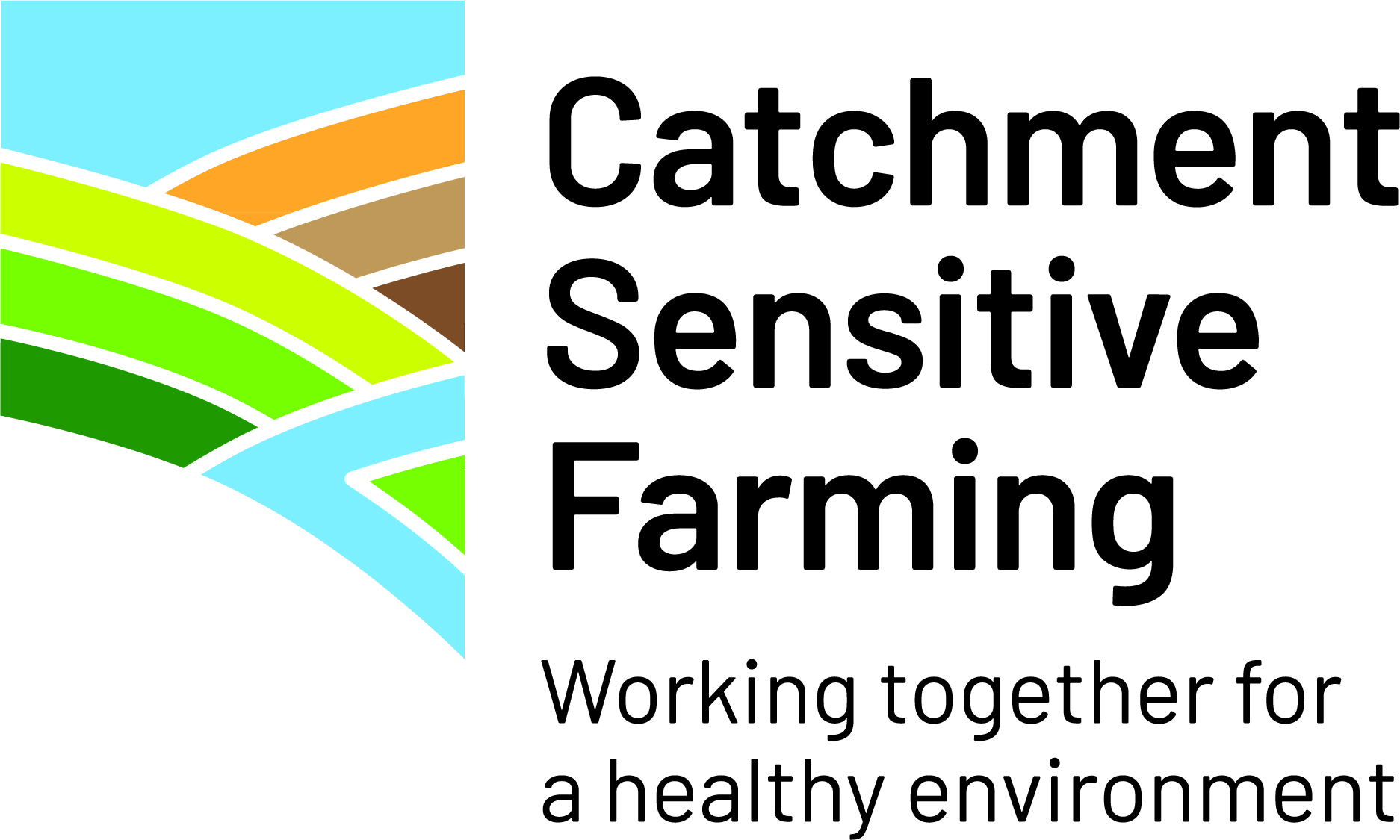

Agency overview
- Formed: 2006
- Jurisdiction: England
- Parent department: Natural England
- Parent agency: Department for Environment, Food and Rural Affairs
- Website: https://www.gov.uk/csf

Catchment Sensitive Farming (CSF) is an English farm advice programme funded by the UK Government. It works with farmers, communities, and organisations across England to improve the quality of water, air, and sustainable water management. Since the programme’s creation it has reduced agricultural pollutant losses by 4–12% across target areas in England. CSF is led by Natural England in partnership with Department for Environment, Food and Rural Affairs and the Environment Agency.

== Objectives ==
CSF’s main objective is to improve water and air quality, and sustainable water management in England by providing farmers and landowners with free advice, training, and grant support in the following areas:

- Soil management
- Nutrient, slurry, and manure management
- Ammonia reduction
- Farm infrastructure and machinery set-up
- Pesticide handling
- Water resources and natural flood management
- Local environmental priorities
- Land management

== Methodology ==
CSF works in river catchments across England, where local teams engage farmers, landowners and the wider community through local events, national shows, e-mail campaigns, phone calls, and on-site visits. Engagement within these catchments is often prioritised based on the environmental issues in these areas.

The CSF programme also works with partners, such as local trusts, authorities, trade bodies and water companies, throughout England, to monitor and improve the condition of landscapes and water courses. Work with partners includes developing tools, media campaigns, and conservation projects that support catchment objectives.

CSF advisers only provide advice and grant approval (for schemes such as Countryside Stewardship), and do not enforce government regulation.

== History ==
A major source of diffuse pollution in English watercourses are from agricultural practices that cause issues such as surface run-off and nutrient pollution. The programme was created in 2006 to address water quality issues in only the worst affected drainage basins of England. In 2018, the additional objective of improving air quality was added to the programme due to increasing ammonia emissions from agriculture. By October 2022, the programme had expanded to cover all of England, though priority is given to catchments with more substantial environmental pressures. Currently the programme is developing natural methodologies to reduce flood risk on agricultural land.
