= Getoor =

Getoor is a surname. Notable people with the surname include:

- Lise Getoor, American computer scientist, daughter of Ronald
- Ronald Getoor (1929–2017), American mathematician, father of Lise
