= Nir Friedman =

Israeli Professor

- ניר פרידמן
- Education: Tel Aviv University, Weizmann Institute of Science, Stanford University
- Awards: Michael Bruno Memorial Award (2010), European Research Council Research Award (2009–2014), Juludan Prize (2007), Sir Zelman Cowen Universities Fund Prize (2007)
- Scientific career
- Fields: Machine Learning and Computational Biology
- Workplaces: Hebrew University of Jerusalem
- Doctoral advisor: Joseph Halpern
- Other academic advisors: David Harel, Stuart Russell
- Notable students: Dana Pe'er

Nir Friedman (Hebrew: ניר פרידמן; born 1967) is an Israeli professor of computer science and biology at the Hebrew University of Jerusalem.

His research combines machine learning and statistical learning with systems biology, specifically in the fields of gene regulation, transcription and chromatin.

== Education and research ==
Friedman earned his BSc degree from Tel Aviv University (1987) and his MSc from the Weizmann Institute of Science (1992). In 1997, he completed his Ph.D. at Stanford under the supervision of Joseph Halpern, in the field of artificial intelligence.

After some postdoctoral work at the University of California, Berkeley, he accepted a faculty position at the School of Computer Science, the Hebrew University of Jerusalem.

His highly cited research includes work on Bayesian network classifiers (with Danny Geiger and Moises Goldszmidt), Bayesian Structural EM, and the use of Bayesian methods to analyzing gene expression data (with Aviv Regev, Dana Pe'er, Eran Segal, Daphne Koller and David Botstein). More recent works focus on Probabilistic Graphical Models, reconstructing Regulatory Networks, Genetic Interactions, and the role of Chromatin in Transcriptional Regulation (with Oliver Rando)

In 2009, Friedman and Koller published a textbook on Probabilistic Graphical Models. Later that year, he joined the Institute of Life Sciences, and opened an experimental lab where he uses advanced robotic tools to study transcriptional regulation in the yeast Saccharomyces cerevisiae.
