= Quantifier =

Quantifier may refer to:

- Quantifier (linguistics), an indicator of quantity
- Quantifier (logic)
- Quantification (science)

== See also ==
- Quantification (disambiguation)
