= The Master Algorithm =

Book by Pedro Domingos

The Master Algorithm: How the Quest for the Ultimate Learning Machine Will Remake Our World
- Author: Pedro Domingos
- Language: English
- Subject: Artificial intelligence
- Genre: Philosophy, popular science
- Publisher: Basic Books
- Publication date: September 22, 2015
- Publication place: United States
- Media type: Print, e-book, audiobook
- Pages: 352 pp.
- ISBN: 978-0465065707

The Master Algorithm: How the Quest for the Ultimate Learning Machine Will Remake Our World is a book by Pedro Domingos released in 2015. Domingos wrote the book in order to generate interest from people outside the field.

== Overview ==
The book outlines five approaches of machine learning: inductive reasoning, connectionism, evolutionary computation, Bayes' theorem and analogical modelling. The author explains these tribes to the reader by referring to more understandable processes of logic, connections made in the brain, natural selection, probability and similarity judgments. Throughout the book, it is suggested that each different tribe has the potential to contribute to a unifying "master algorithm".

Towards the end of the book the author pictures a "master algorithm" in the near future, where machine learning algorithms asymptotically grow to a perfect understanding of how the world and people in it work. Although the algorithm doesn't yet exist, he briefly reviews his own invention of the Markov logic network.

== In the media ==
In 2016 Bill Gates recommended the book, alongside Nick Bostrom's Superintelligence, as one of two books everyone should read to understand AI. In 2018 the book was noted to be on Chinese Communist Party general secretary Xi Jinping's bookshelf.

=== Reception ===
A computer science educator stated in Times Higher Education that the examples are clear and accessible. In contrast, The Economist agreed Domingos "does a good job" but complained that he "constantly invents metaphors that grate or confuse". Kirkus Reviews praised the book, stating that "Readers unfamiliar with logic and computer theory will have a difficult time, but those who persist will discover fascinating insights."

A New Scientist review called it "compelling but rather unquestioning".
