= Aleksandr Gusev =

Aleksandr Gusev may refer to:

- Aleksandr Gusev (field hockey) (1955–1994), field hockey player from the Soviet Union
- Alexander Gusev (ice hockey) (1947–2020), Soviet ice hockey player and Olympic champion
- Alexandr Vladimirovich Gussev or Gusev (1917–1999), Russian parasitologist, specialist of monogeneans
- Aleksandr Gusev (politician) (born 1963), Russian politician and governor of Voronezh Oblast
- Alexander Gusev (scientist), statistical geneticist with an interest in human genetics and oncogenomics
