= Joseph Halpern =

Israeli-American-Canadian computer scientist (1953–2026)

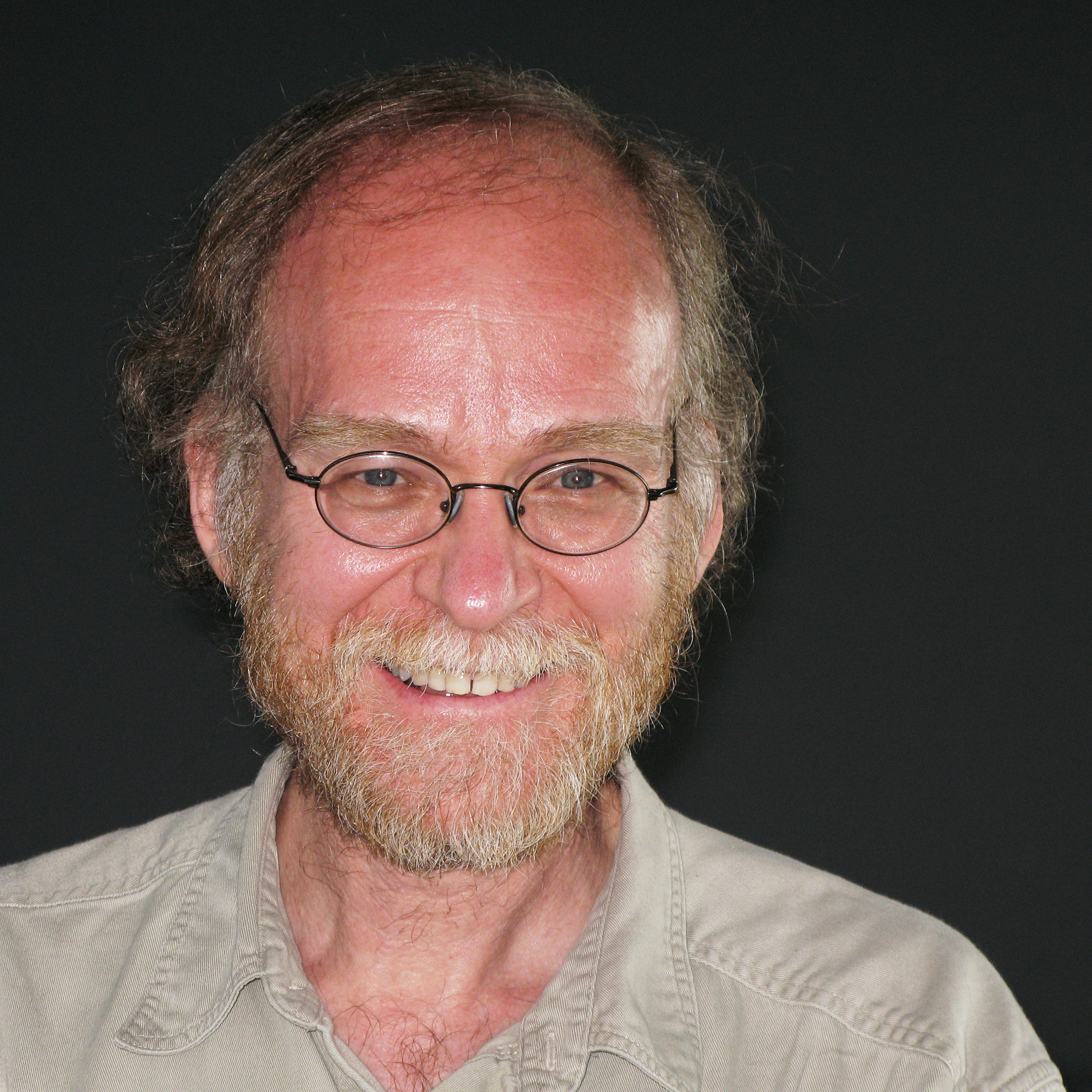
- Halpern in 2008
- Born: May 29, 1953; Israel
- Died: February 13, 2026 (aged 72); Ithaca, New York, U.S.
- Awards: Gödel Prize (1997); Allen Newell Award (2008); Dijkstra Prize (2009)
- Scientific career
- Fields: Computer science
- Workplaces: Cornell University
- Doctoral students: Nir Friedman, Daphne Koller, Yoram Moses

Joseph Yehuda Halpern (May 29, 1953 – February 13, 2026) was an Israeli-American professor of computer science at Cornell University. Most of his research is on reasoning about knowledge and uncertainty.

== Life and career ==
Halpern graduated in 1975 from University of Toronto with a B.S. in mathematics. He went on to earn a Ph.D. in mathematics from Harvard University in 1981 under the supervision of Albert R. Meyer and Gerald Sacks. He has written three books, Actual Causality, Reasoning about Uncertainty, and Reasoning About Knowledge and won the 1997 Gödel Prize in theoretical computer science and the 2009 Dijkstra Prize in distributed computing.

In 1993, Halpern was elected as a Fellow of the Association for the Advancement of Artificial Intelligence (AAAI) for sustained excellence in theoretical research on the logics of and relationships among knowledge, common knowledge, belief and probability.

From 1997 to 2003, he was editor-in-chief of the Journal of the ACM.

In 2002, he was inducted as a Fellow of the Association for Computing Machinery and in 2012 he was selected as an IEEE Fellow. In 2011, he was awarded a Senior Fellowship of the Zukunftskolleg at the University of Konstanz.

In 2019, Halpern was elected a member of the National Academy of Engineering for methods of reasoning about knowledge, belief, and uncertainty and their applications to distributed computing and multiagent systems.

Halpern was also the administrator for the Computing Research Repository, the computer science branch of arXiv.org, and the moderator for the "general literature" and "other" subsections of the repository.

His students include Nir Friedman, Daphne Koller, and Yoram Moses.

Halpern died on February 13, 2026, at the age of 72.
