= Quantification =

Quantification may refer to:

- Quantification (science), the act of counting and measuring
- Quantification (machine learning), the task of estimating class prevalence values in unlabelled data by means of supervised learning
- Quantifier (linguistics), an indicator of quantity
- Quantifier (logic)
