= Alexander Gusev (professor) =

Statistical geneticist

- Education: University of Connecticut, Columbia University (PhD)
- Scientific career
- Fields: Computational biology Oncogenomics; Human genetics
- Institutions: Harvard Medical School
- Thesis: Quantifying recent variation and relatedness in human populations (2012)
- Doctoral advisor: Itsik Pe'er

Alexander (Sasha) Gusev is a research scientist and associate professor of medicine at Harvard Medical School and the Dana Farber Cancer Institute. At the former, he leads the Clinical Computational Oncology Group.

== Research and career ==
In his cancer research, he has identified 34 new genes associated with increased risk of earliest-stage ovarian cancer. He has developed computational methods that integrate molecular data to facilitate functional interpretation of findings from genome-wide association studies. He has contributed to the development of the transcriptome-wide association study approach to mapping disease-associated genes. In addition, he studies the interactions between germline (host) and somatic events (tumor) – which are typically studied separately – and their effects on cancer progression and treatment response to advance precision oncology.

=== Awards and honors ===
- Presidential Early Career Award for Scientists and Engineers, 2025
- Lenna Peltonen Prize, 2024

== Personal views ==
Gusev has taken a strong stance against scientific racism and, according in an interview with journalist, Garrison Hayes, for the progressive magazine Mother Jones, stating his intent to continue making arguments and clarifications against pseudoscience for the benefit of the general public. He addresses common questions about the genetic basis of behavior and racial differences, emphasizing the complexities and limitations inherent in these topics. Gusev argues against the misuse of genetic data to support far-right ideologies, highlighting the importance of distinguishing between correlation and causation in genetic studies.

== Selected publications ==
- Integrative approaches for large-scale transcriptome-wide association studies. A Gusev, A Ko, H Shi, G Bhatia, W Chung, B Penninx, R Jansen, E Geus, et al. Nature Genetics. 48(3):245–252. doi:10.1038/ng.3506
- Transcriptome-wide association study of schizophrenia and chromatin activity yields mechanistic disease insights. A Gusev, N Mancuso, H Won, M Kousi, HK Finucane, Y Reshef, L Song, et al. Nature Genetics. 50(4):538-548. doi:10.1038/s41588-018-0092-1
- Quantifying genetic effects on disease mediated by assayed gene expression levels. Yao DW, O'Connor LJ, Price AL, Gusev A. Nature Genetics. 52(6):626-633. doi:10.1038/s41588-020-0625-2
- Allele-specific epigenetic activity in prostate cancer and normal prostate tissue implicates prostate cancer risk mechanisms. Shetty A, Seo JH, Bell CA, O'Connor EP, Pomerantz MM, Freedman ML, Gusev A. The American Journal of Human Genetics. 108(11):2071-2085. doi:10.1016/j.ajhg.2021.09.008
- Atlas of prostate cancer heritability in European and African-American men pinpoints tissue-specific regulation. A Gusev, H Shi, G Kichaev, M Pomerantz, F Li et al. Nature Communications. doi:10.1038/ncomms10979
- Partitioning heritability of regulatory and cell-type-specific variants across 11 common diseases. A Gusev, SH Lee, G Trynka, H Finucane et al. The American Journal of Human Genetics. 95(5):535-52. doi:10.1016/j.ajhg.2014.10.004
- Genetic ancestry contributes to somatic mutations in lung cancers from admixed Latin American populations. J Carrot-Zhang, G Soca-Chafre, N Patterson,..., A Gusev, M Meyerson. Cancer Discovery. 11(3):591-598. doi:10.1158/2159-8290.CD-20-1165
