= Ben Taskar =

American computer scientist

- Born: March 3, 1977
- Died: November 18, 2013 (aged 36)
- Education: Stanford University
- Known for: Statistical relational learning, Graphical models
- Scientific career
- Fields: Computer Science, Machine Learning and Statistical relational learning
- Workplaces: University of Pennsylvania, and University of Washington, Seattle
- Doctoral advisor: Daphne Koller
- Website: homes.cs.washington.edu/~taskar/

Ben Taskar (March 3, 1977 – November 18, 2013) was a professor and researcher in the area of machine learning and applications to computational linguistics and computer vision. He was a Magerman Term Associate Professor for Computer and Information Science at University of Pennsylvania. He co-directed PRiML: Penn Research in Machine Learning, a joint venture between the School of Engineering and Wharton. He was also a Distinguished Research Fellow at the Annenberg Center for Public Policy. At the University of Washington, he held the Boeing Professorship.

He was the first person to define Max-margin Markov networks and a pioneer in statistical relational learning.

Ben Taskar died of an apparent heart attack on the night of November 17, 2013, at the age of 36.

== Bibliography ==
- Taskar, Ben A. (2007). Introduction to statistical relational learning. MIT Press.
- Taskar, Ben (2010). A Survey on Statistical Relational Learning. Springer.

== Sources ==
- Ben Taskar memorial, UW CSE News
- UW computer science professor Ben Taskar passes away at 36 news, Geek Wire
