= Pedro Domingos =

Professor Emeritus of computer science and engineering (born 1965)

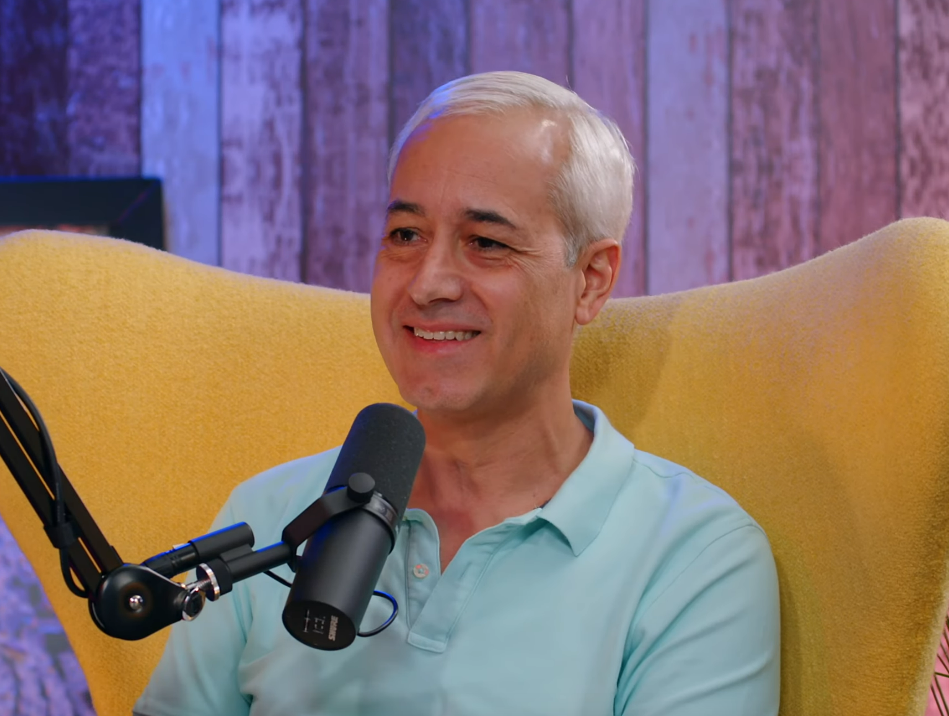
- Domingos in 2023
- Born: 1965 (age 60–61); Lisbon, Portugal
- Education: University of California, Irvine (MS, PhD); Instituto Superior Técnico - University of Lisbon (MS, Licentiate)
- Known for: The Master Algorithm Markov logic network
- Awards: SIGKDD Innovation Award (2014); AAAI Fellowship (2010); Sloan Fellowship (2003); Fulbright Scholarship (1992-1997)
- Scientific career
- Fields: Artificial intelligence Machine learning Data science
- Workplaces: University of Washington
- Thesis: A Unified Approach to Concept Learning (1997)
- Doctoral advisor: Dennis F. Kibler
- Doctoral students: Tessa Lau
- Website: homes.cs.washington.edu/~pedrod/

Pedro Domingos (born 1965) is a Professor Emeritus of computer science and engineering at the University of Washington. He is a researcher in machine learning known for Markov logic network enabling uncertain inference.

== Education ==
Domingos received an undergraduate degree and Master of Science degree from Instituto Superior Técnico (IST). He moved to the University of California, Irvine, where he received a Master of Science degree followed by his PhD.

== Research and career ==
After spending two years as an assistant professor at IST, he joined the University of Washington as an assistant professor of Computer Science and Engineering in 1999 and became a full professor in 2012. He started a machine learning research group at the hedge fund D. E. Shaw & Co. in 2018, but left in 2019.

He co-founded the International Machine Learning Society. As of 2018, he was on the editorial board of Machine Learning journal.

=== Publications ===
- Pedro Domingos, The Master Algorithm: How the Quest for the Ultimate Learning Machine Will Remake Our World, New York, Basic Books, 2015, ISBN 978-0-465-06570-7.
- Pedro Domingos, "Our Digital Doubles: AI will serve our species, not control it", Scientific American, vol. 319, no. 3 (September 2018), pp. 88–93. "AIs are like autistic savants and will remain so for the foreseeable future.... AIs lack common sense and can easily make errors that a human never would... They are also liable to take our instructions too literally, giving us precisely what we asked for instead of what we actually wanted." (p. 93.)
- Pedro Domingos, 2040: A Silicon Valley Satire, BookBaby, 2024, ISBN 979-8-350-96334-2.

=== Awards and honors ===
- 2014: ACM SIGKDD Innovation Award. for his foundational research in data stream analysis, cost-sensitive classification, adversarial learning, and Markov logic networks, as well as applications in viral marketing and information integration.
- 2010: Elected an Association for the Advancement of Artificial Intelligence (AAAI) Fellow. For significant contributions to the field of machine learning and to the unification of first-order logic and probability.
- 2003: Sloan Fellowship
- 1992–1997: Fulbright Scholarship
