= Dana Pe'er =

Israeli bioinformatician (born 1971)

- דנה פאר
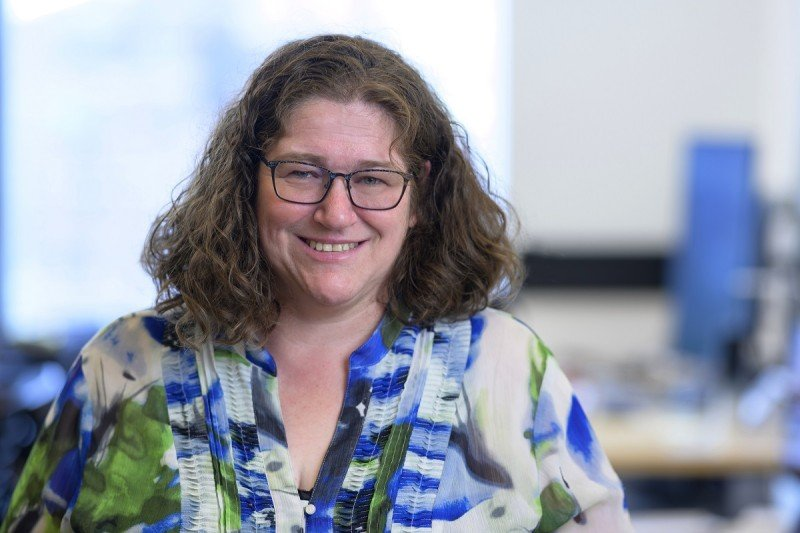
- Dana Pe'er
- Born: 1971 (age 54–55)
- Education: Hebrew University of Jerusalem
- Spouse: Itsik Pe'er
- Children: Inbar, Carmel
- Awards: Packard Fellow (2009); Overton Prize (2014); ISCB Fellow (2021)
- Scientific career
- Fields: Biology; Computational biology Systems biology
- Workplaces: Harvard Medical School; Columbia University; Memorial Sloan Kettering Cancer Center
- Thesis: From Gene Expression to Molecular Pathways (2003)
- Doctoral advisor: Nir Friedman
- Other academic advisors: George M. Church

Dana Pe'er (Hebrew: דנה פאר; born 1971), Chair and Professor in Computational and Systems Biology Program at Sloan Kettering Institute is a researcher in computational systems biology. A Howard Hughes Medical Institute (HHMI) Investigator since 2021, she was previously a professor at Columbia Department of Biological Sciences. Pe'er's research focuses on understanding the organization, function and evolution of molecular networks, particularly how genetic variations alter the regulatory network and how these genetic variations can cause cancer.

== Early life and education ==
Pe'er was born in Israel. Her husband, Itsik Pe'er, is a computational biologist at Columbia University. Together, they have raised two daughters.

Pe'er received a bachelor's degree in mathematics in 1995, as well as master's in 1999 and PhD degrees in computer science in 2003, from the Hebrew University of Jerusalem. She earned her master's degree under Avi Widgerson, and carried out her PhD research in the lab of Nir Friedman.

She subsequently performed postdoctoral work with George Church at Harvard. Her fellowship focused on how genetic variation changes the regulatory network between individuals and how this subsequently manifests in phenotypic diversity.

== Career ==
In 2006, Pe'er established a research group in the Department of Biological Sciences and Systems Biology at Columbia University. Pe'er's group at Columbia developed computational methods that combine diverse sources of high throughput genomics data, with the aim of developing a holistic view of the cell at a systems level.

In 2016, Pe'er joined the Sloan Kettering Institute in New York City. While at Sloan, Pe'er was selected as a Howard Hughes Medical Institute (HHMI) Investigator in September, 2021.

Pe'er is also involved in the Human Cell Atlas as a member of the organizing committee, co-chair of the Analysis Working Group, and member of the Human Lung Cell Atlas initiative, and serves on the scientific advisory board of scverse.

== Research ==
In her PhD work, Pe'er demonstrated that Bayesian networks can describe interactions between thousands of genes, enabling the analysis of data from newly available DNA microarrays, which generate thousands of noisy measurements of gene expression. The approach has been widely applied to genome-scale sequencing data. In her postdoctoral work, she used this framework to study protein signaling networks in multivariate flow cytometry data.

At Columbia, Pe'er applied Bayesian networks to integrate different data types for the study of gene regulatory networks, determining how DNA sequence variation alters the regulation of gene expression, with a view towards personalized medicine.

The Pe'er research group has developed a series of methods for high-throughput single-cell data analysis, initially to address a new high-dimensional data type derived from mass cytometry, which quantifies a few dozen proteins per cell for millions of cells at a time. They introduced the application of non-linear dimensionality reduction by t-distributed stochastic neighbor embedding (t-SNE) to visualize high-dimensional single-cell RNA sequencing data, and the use of a nearest neighbors graph to represent the data manifold of RNA-defined cell states. The Pe'er group used this formalization to identify discrete cell types or cell states by applying the Louvain community detection method to cluster data, and demonstrated that cells can be ordered along differentiation trajectories from individual samples, due to the asynchrony of cells found in tissue samples. By modeling trajectories as a Markov process, they showed that cells can be assigned probabilities for reaching any given terminal fate along a trajectory. In 2020, the Pe'er and Fabian Theis groups presented CellRank, an algorithm that uncovers cellular dynamics by combining trajectories based on cell-cell similarity with local RNA velocity information, which identifies nascent transcriptional states by the proportion of spliced-to-unspliced RNA transcripts.

Pe'er applies these methods to model biological questions around cellular plasticity and single-cell phenotypic variation in cancer, developmental biology, and immunology, including tumor microenvironments, metastasis and responses to treatments such as immunotherapy. "We are beginning to understand that plasticity is a key hallmark of cancer," said Dr. Pe'er. "It is the cancer cell's plasticity that allows it to make such a switch to survive."

Upon accepting the International Society for Computational Biology's Overton Prize in 2014, Pe'er said, "Math is rigorous, and biology is messy, so the trick is to find the pattern in the mess, and machine learning provides a powerful toolbox."

== Selected publications ==
- Friedman, Nir; Linial, Michal; Nachman, Iftach; Pe'Er, Dana (2000). "Using Bayesian Networks to Analyze Expression Data". Journal of Computational Biology. 7 (3–4): 601–620. doi:10.1089/106652700750050961. PMID 11108481.
- Sachs, Karen; Perez, Omar; Pe'Er, Dana; Lauffenburger, Douglas A.; Nolan, Garry P. (2005). "Causal Protein-Signaling Networks Derived from Multiparameter Single-Cell Data". Science. 308 (5721): 523–529. Bibcode:2005Sci...308..523S. doi:10.1126/science.1105809. PMID 15845847. S2CID 8160280.
- Bendall, Sean C.; Davis, Kara L.; Amir, El-ad David; Tadmor, Michelle D.; Simonds, Erin F.; Chen, Tiffany J.; Shenfeld, Daniel K.; Nolan, Garry P.; Pe'Er, Dana (2014). "Single-Cell Trajectory Detection Uncovers Progression and Regulatory Coordination in Human B Cell Development". Cell. 157 (3): 714–725. doi:10.1016/j.cell.2014.04.005. PMC 4045247. PMID 24766814.
- Levine, Jacob H.; Simonds, Erin F.; Bendall, Sean C.; Davis, Kara L.; Amir, El-ad D.; Tadmor, Michelle D.; Litvin, Oren; Fienberg, Harris G.; Jager, Astraea; Zunder, Eli R.; Finck, Rachel; Gedman, Amanda L.; Radtke, Ina; Downing, James R.; Pe'Er, Dana; Nolan, Garry P. (2015). "Data-Driven Phenotypic Dissection of AML Reveals Progenitor-like Cells that Correlate with Prognosis". Cell. 162 (1): 184–197. doi:10.1016/j.cell.2015.05.047. PMC 4508757. PMID 26095251. S2CID 11608684.
- Azizi, Elham; Carr, Ambrose J.; Plitas, George; Cornish, Andrew E.; Konopacki, Catherine; Prabhakaran, Sandhya; Nainys, Juozas; Wu, Kenmin; Kiseliovas, Vaidotas; Setty, Manu; Choi, Kristy; Fromme, Rachel M.; Dao, Phuong; McKenney, Peter T.; Wasti, Ruby C.; Kadaveru, Krishna; Mazutis, Linas; Rudensky, Alexander Y.; Pe'Er, Dana (2018). "Single-Cell Map of Diverse Immune Phenotypes in the Breast Tumor Microenvironment". Cell. 174 (5): 1293–1308.e36. doi:10.1016/j.cell.2018.05.060. PMC 6348010. PMID 29961579.
- Nowotschin, Sonja; Setty, Manu; Kuo, Ying-Yi; Liu, Vincent; Garg, Vidur; Sharma, Roshan; Simon, Claire S.; Saiz, Nestor; Gardner, Rui; Boutet, Stéphane C.; Church, Deanna M.; Hoodless, Pamela A.; Hadjantonakis, Anna-Katerina; Pe'Er, Dana (2019). "The emergent landscape of the mouse gut endoderm at single-cell resolution". Nature. 569 (7756): 361–367. Bibcode:2019Natur.569..361N. doi:10.1038/s41586-019-1127-1. PMC 6724221. PMID 30959515.
- Laughney, Ashley M.; Hu, Jing; Campbell, Nathaniel R.; Bakhoum, Samuel F.; Setty, Manu; Lavallée, Vincent-Philippe; Xie, Yubin; Masilionis, Ignas; Carr, Ambrose J.; Kottapalli, Sanjay; Allaj, Viola; Mattar, Marissa; Rekhtman, Natasha; Xavier, Joao B.; Mazutis, Linas; Poirier, John T.; Rudin, Charles M.; Pe'Er, Dana; Massagué, Joan (2020). "Regenerative lineages and immune-mediated pruning in lung cancer metastasis". Nature Medicine. 26 (2): 259–269. doi:10.1038/s41591-019-0750-6. PMC 7021003. PMID 32042191.
- Friedman, N.; Linial, M.; Nachman, I.; Pe'er, D. (2000). "Using Bayesian Networks to Analyze Expression Data". Journal of Computational Biology. 7 (3–4): 601–620. doi:10.1089/106652700750050961. PMID 11108481.
- Segal, E.; Shapira, M.; Regev, A.; Pe'er, D.; Botstein, D.; Koller, D.; Friedman, N. (2003). "Module networks: Identifying regulatory modules and their condition-specific regulators from gene expression data". Nature Genetics. 34 (2): 166–176. doi:10.1038/ng1165. PMID 12740579. S2CID 6146032.
- Sachs, K.; Perez, O; Pe'Er, D; Lauffenburger, D. A.; Nolan, G. P. (2005). "Causal Protein-Signaling Networks Derived from Multiparameter Single-Cell Data". Science. 308 (5721): 523–9. Bibcode:2005Sci...308..523S. doi:10.1126/science.1105809. PMID 15845847. S2CID 8160280.
- Bendall, S. C.; Simonds, E. F.; Qiu, P.; Amir, E. -A. D.; Krutzik, P. O.; Finck, R.; Bruggner, R. V.; Melamed, R.; Trejo, A.; Ornatsky, O. I.; Balderas, R. S.; Plevritis, S. K.; Sachs, K.; Pe'Er, D.; Tanner, S. D.; Nolan, G. P. (2011). "Single-Cell Mass Cytometry of Differential Immune and Drug Responses Across a Human Hematopoietic Continuum". Science. 332 (6030): 687–696. Bibcode:2011Sci...332..687B. doi:10.1126/science.1198704. PMC 3273988. PMID 21551058.

== Memberships ==
- Editorial and Advisory Board of Cell
- Human Cell Atlas Organizing Committee and co-chair of Analysis Working Group
- EMBL Scientific Advisory Committee
- ISREC - EPFL Scientific Advisory Board
- The Pew Charitable Trusts National Advisory Committee, Pew Biomedical Scholars Program
- Fellow of the International Society for Computational Biology
- Howard Hughes Medical Institute (HHMI) Investigator
- Fellow of the American Association for Cancer Research Academy

== Awards ==
- 2023 ISCB Innovator Award
- 2019 Crain's Notable Women in Healthcare
- 2019 Ernst W. Bertner Memorial Award
- 2014 NIH Director's Pioneer Award
- 2014 ISCB Overton Prize
- 2012 RECOMB Test of Time Award
- 2011 Stand Up To Cancer Innovative Research Grant
- 2009 Packard Fellowship in Science and Engineering
- 2007 NIH Director's New Innovator Award
- 2005 Career Award at the Interface of Science, Burroughs Wellcome Fund
