= Struc2vec =

struc2vec is a framework to generate node vector representations on a graph that preserve the structural identity. In contrast to node2vec, that optimizes node embeddings so that nearby nodes in the graph have similar embedding, struc2vec captures the roles of nodes in a graph, even if structurally similar nodes are far apart in the graph. It learns low-dimensional representations for nodes in a graph, generating random walks through a constructed multi-layer graph starting at each graph node. It is useful for machine learning applications where the downstream application is more related with the structural equivalence of the nodes (e.g., it can be used to detect nodes in networks with similar functions, such as interns in the social network of a corporation). struc2vec identifies nodes that play a similar role based solely on the structure of the graph, for example computing the structural identity of individuals in social networks. In particular, struc2vec employs a degree-based method to measure the pairwise structural role similarity, which is then adopted to build the multi-layer graph. Moreover, the distance between the latent representation of nodes is strongly correlated to their structural similarity. The framework contains three optimizations: reducing the length of degree sequences considered, reducing the number of pairwise similarity calculations, and reducing the number of layers in the generated graph.

struc2vec follows the intuition that random walks through a graph can be treated as sentences in a corpus. Each node in a graph is treated as an individual word, and short random walk is treated as a sentence. In its final phase, the algorithm employs Gensim's word2vec algorithm to learn embeddings based on biased random walks. Sequences of nodes are fed into a skip-gram or continuous bag of words model and traditional machine-learning techniques for classification can be used. It is considered a useful framework to learn node embeddings based on structural equivalence.
