= Lada Adamic =

American network scientist

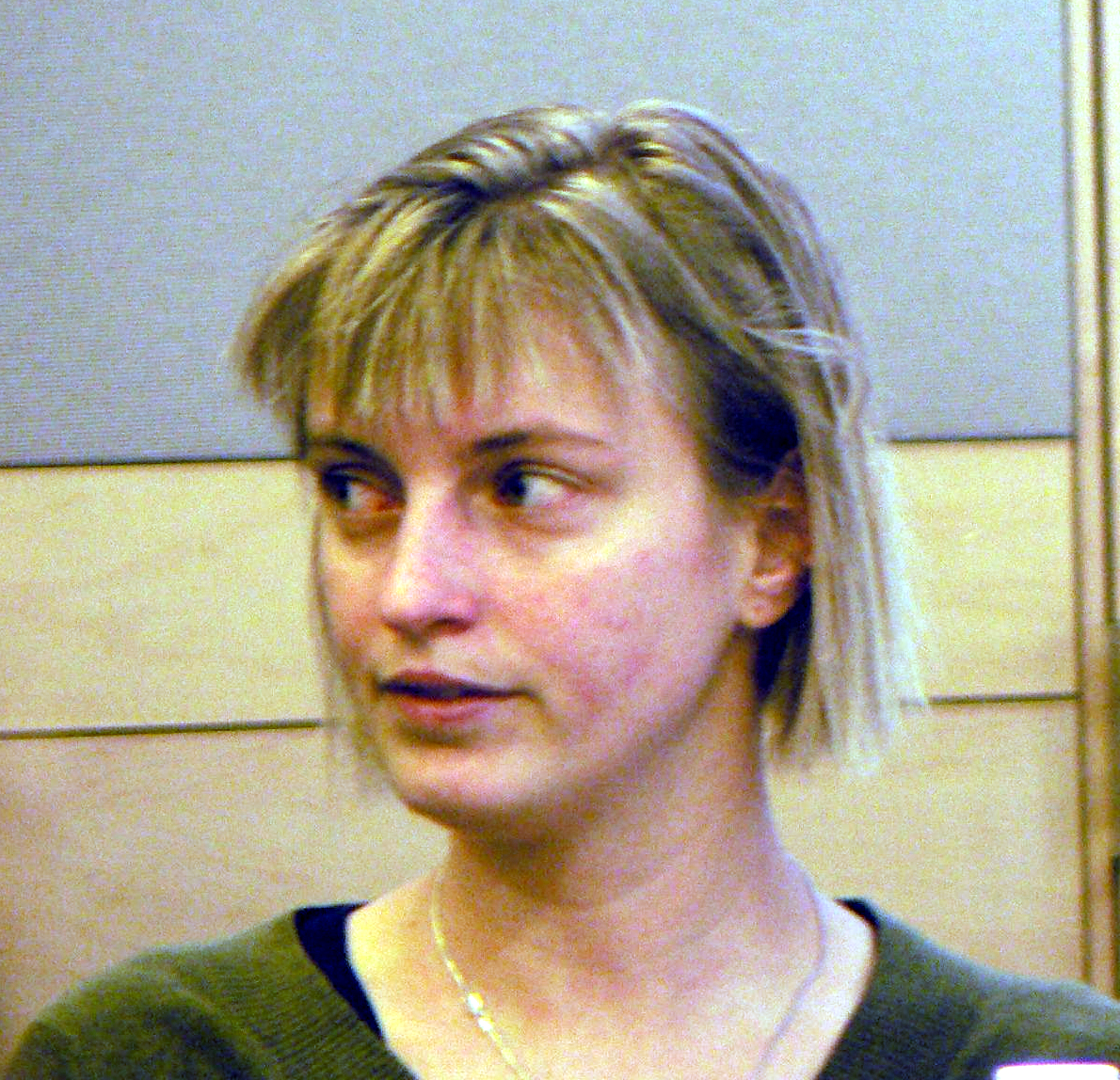
- Lada Adamic at Cornell
- Education: California Institute of Technology (BS); Stanford University (PhD)
- Occupation: network scientist
- Organizations: Facebook; University of Michigan; HP Labs
- Awards: Lagrange Prize, Fellow of the Network Science Society (NetSci), 2021.

Lada Adamic is an American network scientist, who researches information dynamics in networks. She studies how network structure influences the flow of information, how information influences the evolution of networks, and crowdsourced knowledge sharing.

Adamic was a director of research at Facebook, where she led a computational social science team. She was previously an associate professor at the University of Michigan until 2013. Previously she worked in Hewlett-Packard's Information Dynamics Lab on research projects relating to network constructed from large data sets.

== Education ==
From 1990 Adamic attended Stuyvesant High School, one of the nine specialized high schools in New York City, where she was a member of mathematics team. Her family moved to Boulder, Colorado in 1992 and she attended Fairview High School.

Adamic received her bachelor's degree in physics, engineering and applied science at California Institute of Technology in 1997 and her Ph.D. degree in applied physics at Stanford University in 2001. In 1994–1995 she was an undergraduate research assistant at Caltech working on designing an electrostatic solar wind concentrator for the Genesis mission. In 1996–1997 she worked on the project of materials deposition with pulsed laser ablation. While writing her Ph.D. thesis named "Network Dynamics: The World Wide Web" at Stanford she also worked with Xerox PARC researchers and modeled growth and search processes of the Internet.

== Academic career ==
Adamic worked for four years in Hewlett Packard labs as a research scientist where she studied networks created from large data sets, such as studying medical literature for gene-disease connections and modelling search processes on real-world social networks.

In 2005 Adamic left HP Labs for the University of Michigan. She took a sabbatical in 2013 to join Facebook's data scientist team, where she stayed. Adamic is an editor for information science at the Network Science journal. Since April 2013, the journal publishes 3 issues per year. Adamic taught an online course "Social Network Analysis" on Coursera.

== Research and achievements ==
Adamic's research is focused on analysing virtual world and social networks in particular. Together with Eytan Adar she holds U.S. patent 07162522 on User profile classification by web usage analysis. The method allows to predict user attributes (demographic information) based on an analysis of accessed web pages. While working on her PhD, Adamic obtained another U.S. patent 6631451 and 6415368: System and method for caching. It uses quality or value attributes, provided by a recommender system or by thorough analysis of site accesses that are attached to cached information to prioritize items in the cache and to identify higher value information. These methods aid in analysing networks.

Adamic studies different aspects of online networks. For instance, using graph and text mining techniques together with her colleagues, she analyzed the usage patterns of Twitter during the House, Senate and gubernatorial midterm elections in the U.S. in 2010. They found significant relationships between content and election results, which is why more detailed analysis of several campaigns could be useful to predict which Twitter campaigns are the most effective.

The analysis of cultural differences when using social networks can be useful for the developers of the social networks. Adamic together with her colleagues is exploring these differences. In one of her papers she tries to find the differences between usage of Q & A tools in social networks across two Western (United States and United Kingdom) and two Eastern cultures (China and India). It turned out that Eastern users tend to write serious professional networking questions, whereas Western users post questions just for fun. These differences are important for designing social networks for specific cultures.

Studying how family members communicate on Facebook revealed that the interaction on Facebook doesn't decrease with the distance, which means that in the U.S. Facebook is a very important tool for parents/grandparents to communicate with their children/grandchildren. The results of the paper are actually very important and can be used to prioritize news stories, recommend friend connections with other relatives or automatically generate lists for privacy settings.

In her paper about rating friends on Facebook, Dr. Adamic and her co-authors suggest the way to improve Facebook system of ranking friends to avoid awkward situations when friends rated one another differently. Particularly they suggest to use an alternative, anonymous feedback system.

The other question which interests Adamic is information diffusion through social networks. After studying 253 million subjects on Facebook, they found that weak ties are more influential than strong ties. Tie strength is determined by how often individuals communicate with each other through private messaging, replying to the same comments, or the number of real-world communication captured by Facebook. There is no doubt that mass adoption of online social networks lead to high information flow and high availability of this information for the individuals. However, it turned out that in transmitting important information such as new job vacancies or future plans weak ties have an advantage compared to the strong ties, because they have fewer mutual contacts, this is why every person has access to the information to which the other person does not.

== Awards ==
Adamic has received National Science Foundation CAREER Award to fund her research on the social dynamics of information and University of Michigan Henry Russell award in recognition of her teaching and research. In 2012 she got Lagrange Prize in Complex Systems and best paper awards from International Conference on Information Systems (ICIS) 2011, International Conference on Weblogs and Social Media (ICWSM) 2011, International Conference on Webblogs and Social Media (ICWSM) 2010, Hypertext 2008. Her paper "Tracking Information Epidemics in Blogspace" written with E. Adar got the Web Intelligence most influential paper of the decade award in 2011.

== Selected publications ==
- E. Adar and L.A. Adamic, "Tracking Information Epidemics in Blogspace", Web Intelligence 2005, Compiegne, France, Sept. 19–22, 2005
- L.A. Adamic and B.A. Huberman, "Information dynamics in a networked world", In Complex Networks, Eli Ben-Naim et al., editors. Lecture Notes in Physics, Springer, 2003
- L.A. Adamic, R.M. Lukose and B.A. Huberman, "Local Search in Unstructured Networks", in Handbook of Graphs and Networks: From the Genome to the Internet, S. Bornholdt, and H.G. Schuster (eds.), Wiley-VCH, Berlin, 2002
- J. Yang, Z. Wen, L.A. Adamic, M.S. Ackerman, C.-Y. Lin, Collaborating Globally: Culture and Organisational Computer-Mediated Communications. Proc. ICIS, 2011
- L.A. Adamic, D. Lauterbach, C.-Y. Teng, M.S. Ackerman, "Rating Friends Without Making Enemies", ICWSM 2011
- E. Bakshy, M.P. Simmons, D.A. Huffaker, C.-Y. Teng, L.A. Adamic, The social dynamics of economic activity in a virtual world, ICWSM 2010, Washington D.C., 2010
- X. Shi, M. Bonner, L.A. Adamic, A. Gilbert, The very small world of the well-connected, in Hypertext'08, Pittsburgh, PA, 2008
- E. Bakshy, I. Rosenn, C. Marlow, and L.A. Adamic, The role of Social Networks in Information Diffusion, WWW'12

== See also ==
- Adamic/Adar index
