= Mehran Sahami =

Iranian computer scientist

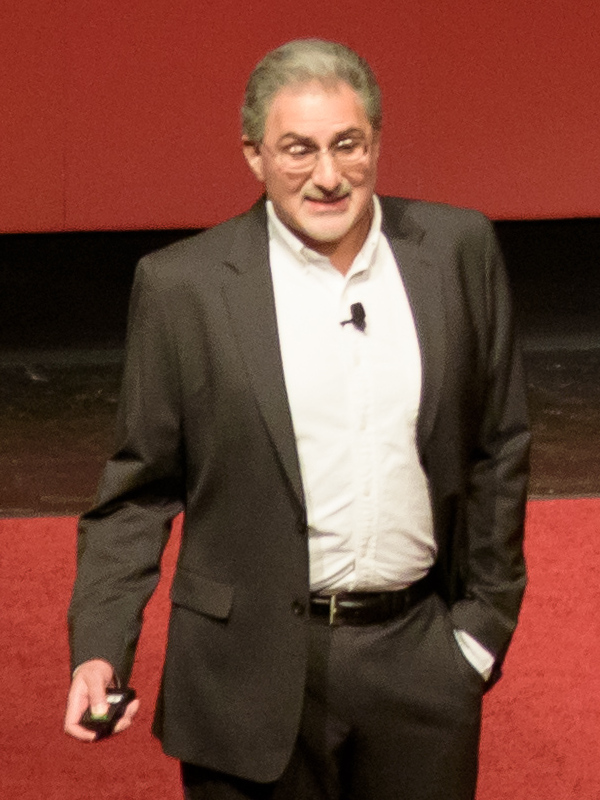
- Born: May 10, 1970 (age 56)
- Education: Stanford University (BS, PhD)
- Known for: Spam filter
- Scientific career
- Fields: Computer science education Machine learning Information retrieval
- Workplaces: Stanford University; Google Inc; Epiphany, Inc.
- Thesis: Using Machine Learning to Improve Information Access (1999)
- Doctoral advisor: Daphne Koller
- Website: profiles.stanford.edu/mehran-sahami

Mehran Sahami is an Iranian-American computer scientist, engineer, and professor. He is the James and Ellenor Chesebrough Professor in the School of Engineering, and Professor (Teaching) and Chair of the Computer Science department at Stanford University. He is also the Robert and Ruth Halperin University Fellow in Undergraduate Education.

== Education ==
Sahami earned his Bachelor of Science degree in 1992 and PhD in 1999 from Stanford University for research supervised by Daphne Koller.

== Career and research ==
Sahami's research interests are in computer science education, machine learning and information retrieval.

Prior to joining the Stanford faculty, he was a senior research scientist at Google, Inc. as well as a senior engineering manager at Epiphany, Inc.

Sahami teaches the introductory computer science sequence at Stanford. He led Stanford's computer science curriculum redesign from a large core to a smaller core with specialization tracks. Some of his lectures are made available on YouTube and iTunesU.

His research interests include computer science education, artificial intelligence, and ethics. He served as co-chair of the ACM/IEEE-CS joint task force on Computer Science Curricula 2013, which created curricular guidelines for college programs in Computer Science at an international level. He has also served as chair of the ACM Education Board, an elected member of the ACM Council, and was appointed by California Governor Jerry Brown to the state's Computer Science Strategic Implementation Plan Advisory Panel.

=== Awards and honors ===
Sahami was selected by the 2013 graduating senior class to give the annual Class Day Lecture at Stanford University's Commencement Weekend ceremonies.

In 2014, Sahami received the Association for Computing Machinery (ACM) Presidential Award for "outstanding leadership of, and commitment to, the three-year ACM/IEEE-CS effort to produce CS2013, a comprehensive revision of the curricular guidelines for undergraduate programs in computer science". In 2019, he was elected an ACM Distinguished Member.
