= Suchi Saria =

Indian scientist

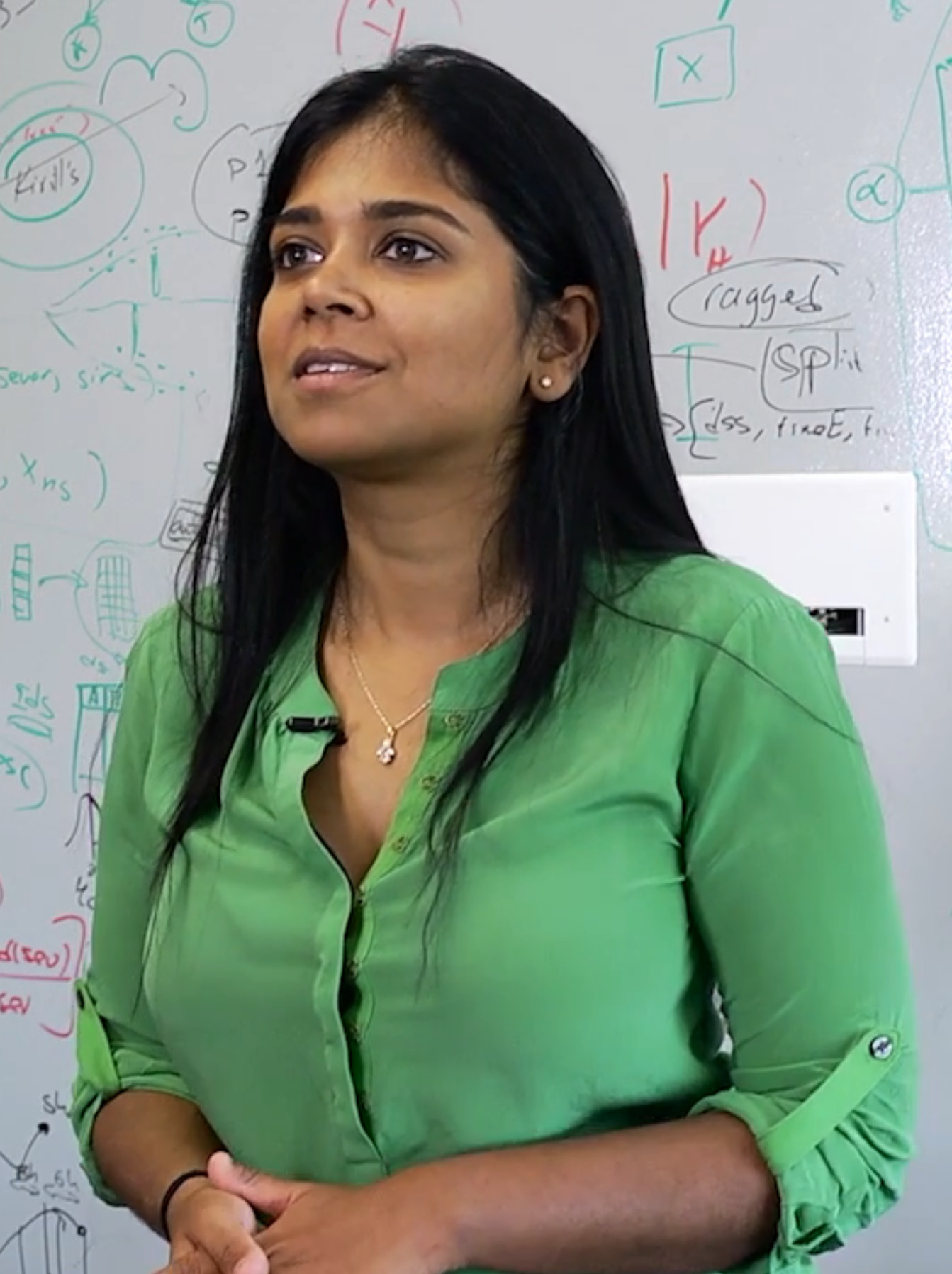
- Suchi Saria in 2019 video from the National Science Foundation
- Born: 1982 or 1983 (age 43–44)
- Education: Mount Holyoke College (BA); Stanford University (MSc, PhD)
- Known for: Personalised medicine; Big data; Machine learning
- Awards: Sloan Research Fellowship (2018); Innovators Under 35 (2017)
- Scientific career
- Fields: Machine Learning; Reasoning under Uncertainty; Causal Inference; Computational Healthcare
- Workplaces: Johns Hopkins University
- Thesis: The Digital Patient: Machine Learning Techniques for Analyzing Electronic Health Record Data (2011)
- Doctoral advisor: Daphne Koller
- Website: suchisaria.jhu.edu

Suchi Saria is an Associate Professor of Machine Learning and Healthcare at Johns Hopkins University, where she uses big data to improve patient outcomes. She is a World Economic Forum Young Global Leader. From 2022 to 2023, she was an investment partner at AIX Ventures. AIX Ventures is a venture capital fund that invests in artificial intelligence startups.

== Early life and education ==
Saria is from Darjeeling. She earned her bachelor's degree at Mount Holyoke College. She was awarded a full scholarship from Microsoft. In 2004 she joined Stanford University as a Rambus Corporation Fellow. She earned her Master of Science and Doctor of Philosophy degrees at Stanford University, supervised by Daphne Koller and advised by Anna Asher Penn and Sebastian Thrun. At Stanford University, Saria developed a statistical model that could predict premature baby outcomes with a 90% accuracy. The model used data from monitors, birth weight and length of time spent in the womb to predict whether a preemie would develop an illness. She worked in the startup Aster Data Systems.

== Career and research ==
Saria believes that big data can be used to personalise healthcare. She is considered an expert in computational statistics and their applications to the real world. She uses Bayesian and probabilistic modelling. In 2014 Saria was funded by a $1.5 million Gordon and Betty Moore Foundation project that looked to make intensive care units safer. The project used data collected at patients' bedsides along with noninvasive 3D sensors that monitor care in patient's hospital rooms. The sensors collect information on steps that might have been missed by doctors; like washing hands.

Saria uses big data to manage chronic diseases. She is part of a National Science Foundation (NSF) award that looks at scleroderma. She uses machine learning to analyse medical records and identify similar patterns of disease progression. The system works out which treatments have been effectively used for various symptoms to aid doctors in choosing treatment plans for specific patients. She has developed another algorithm that can be used to predict and treat Septic shock. The algorithm used 16,000 items of patient health records and generates a targeted real-time warning (TREWS) score. She collaborated with physicians to use the algorithm in clinics, and it was correct 86% of the time. Saria modified the algorithm to avoid missing high risk patients- for example, those who have suffered from septic shock previously and who have sought successful treatment. She was described by XRDS magazine as being a Pioneer in transforming healthcare. In 2016 Saria spoke at about using machine learning for medicine at TEDxBoston. The talk has been viewed over 100,170 times.

=== Awards and honours ===
Her awards and honors include:

- 2018 Sloan Research Fellowship
- 2018 World Economic Forum Young Global Leader
- 2017 MIT Technology Review 35 Innovators Under 35
- 2017 Defense Advanced Projects Research Agency (DARPA) Young Faculty Fellowship
- 2016 Brilliant 10 award by Popular Science
- 2015 IEEE Intelligent Systems Young Star in Artificial Intelligence
- 2015 Johns Hopkins Discovery Award
- 2014 National Science Foundation (NSF) Smart and Connected Health Research Grant
- 2014 Google Research Award
- 2014 Society of Critical Care Medicine Annual Scientific Award
- 2013 Gordon and Betty Moore Foundation Research Award
