= Itsik Pe'er =

Computational biologist

- איציק פאר
- Education: Tel Aviv University
- Scientific career
- Fields: Systems biology Human Genetics; Computer Science
- Workplaces: Columbia University; Broad Institute; Weizmann Institute of Science
- Thesis: Algorithmic Methods for Reconstruction of Biological Sequences, Gene Orders and Maps (2002)
- Doctoral advisor: Ron Shamir

Itsik Pe'er (Hebrew: איציק פאר) is a computational biologist and a Full Professor in the Department of Computer Science at Columbia University.

== Research and career ==
Pe'er has created computational tools for the analysis of high-throughput DNA sequence data. In particular, he has developed an approach to map copy number variation from whole exome sequencing data. He has published approaches to quantify hidden relatedness and infer population structure using DNA data. He has conducted studies on the genetics of complex traits in Ashkenazi Jews, historically a relatively isolated population enabling identification of genetic risk factors for common disorders in all populations. He is generating a comprehensive resource of genetic variants in the population for precision public health.

== Selected publications ==
- Estimation of the multiple testing burden for genomewide association studies of nearly all common variants. I Pe'er, R Yelensky, D Altshuler, MJ Daly Genetic Epidemiology. 32(4):381-5. doi:10.1002/gepi.20303
- Evaluating and improving power in whole-genome association studies using fixed marker sets. I Pe'er, PIW de Bakker, J Maller, R Yelensky, D Altshuler, MJ Daly Nature Genetics. 38(6):663-667. doi:10.1038/ng1816
- Sequencing an Ashkenazi reference panel supports population-targeted personal genomics and illuminates Jewish and European origins. Shai Carmi, Ken Y Hui, Ethan Kochav, Xinmin Liu, James Xue, Fillan Grady, Saurav Guha, Kinnari Upadhyay, Dan Ben-Avraham, Semanti Mukherjee, B Monica Bowen, Tinu Thomas, Joseph Vijai, Marc Cruts, Guy Froyen, Diether Lambrechts, Stéphane Plaisance, Christine Van Broeckhoven, Philip Van Damme, Herwig Van Marck, Nir Barzilai, Ariel Darvasi, Kenneth Offit, Susan Bressman, Laurie J Ozelius, Inga Peter, Judy H Cho, Harry Ostrer, Gil Atzmon, Lorraine N Clark, Todd Lencz, Itsik Pe’er. Nature Communications. doi:10.1038/ncomms5835

== Personal life ==
Itsik Pe'er is married to Dana Pe'er, a computational biologist at Sloan Kettering Institute.
