= Eran Segal =

Israeli computational biologist

- ערן סגל
- Born: November 15, 1973 (age 52)
- Education: Stanford University; Tel Aviv University
- Awards: Fellow, ISCB (2026); Overton Prize (2007)
- Scientific career
- Fields: Computational biology Systems biology Microbiome; Personalized medicine
- Workplaces: Rockefeller University; Weizmann Institute of Science; Mohamed bin Zayed University of Artificial Intelligence
- Thesis: Rich Probabilistic Models for Genomic Data (2004)
- Doctoral advisor: Daphne Koller

Eran Segal (Hebrew: ערן סגל; born 15 November 1973) is a computational biologist professor at the Weizmann Institute of Science. He works on developing quantitative models for all levels of gene regulation, including transcription, chromatin, and translation. In 2006, Segal and Jonathan Widom of Northwestern University published a model of nucleosome positioning along DNA in Nature. Segal also works as an epidemiologist.

== Education ==
Segal earned a BA in Computer Science and Economics from Tel Aviv University in 1998.

He earned a PhD from Stanford University in 2004 advised by Daphne Koller with a dissertation titled: Rich Probabilistic Models for Genomic Data. In support of his graduate study at Stanford he received a Fulbright Foreign Student Program grant in 1999.

== Career ==
After completing his Ph.D., Segal held a postdoctoral research position at Rockefeller University from 2004 to 2005 before joining the Departments of Computer Science and Applied Mathematics and of Molecular Cell Biology at the Weizmann Institute of Science in 2005.

A 2015 study in Cell by Segal and colleagues showed that glucose responses to identical foods vary substantially between individuals. In 2018, Segal launched the Human Phenotype Project at the Weizmann Institute. The longitudinal cohort study collects genomic, microbiome, continuous glucose monitoring, imaging, and lifestyle data from participants across 17 body systems over a 25-year period, with more than 28,000 participants enrolled as of 2025.

As of 2025, Segal serves as Acting Dean of the School of Digital Public Health and Professor of Computational Biology at the Mohamed bin Zayed University of Artificial Intelligence (MBZUAI).

== Awards and honors ==
- Elected Fellow of the International Society for Computational Biology (2026)
- Elected Member of the European Molecular Biology Organization (2015).
- Michael Bruno Memorial Award, Israel Institute for Advanced Studies, Hebrew University of Jerusalem (2015).
- Recipient of three European Research Council (ERC) grants: a Consolidator Grant (2013), an Advanced Grant (2017), and a Proof of Concept Grant (2018).
- Selected for the European Molecular Biology Organization Young Investigator Programme (2007).
- Recipient of the Overton Prize, International Society for Computational Biology (2007).
- Best Paper by a Young Scientist Award, Research in Computational Molecular Biology (RECOMB) (2004).
