= Daphne Koller =

Israeli-American computer scientist (born 1968)

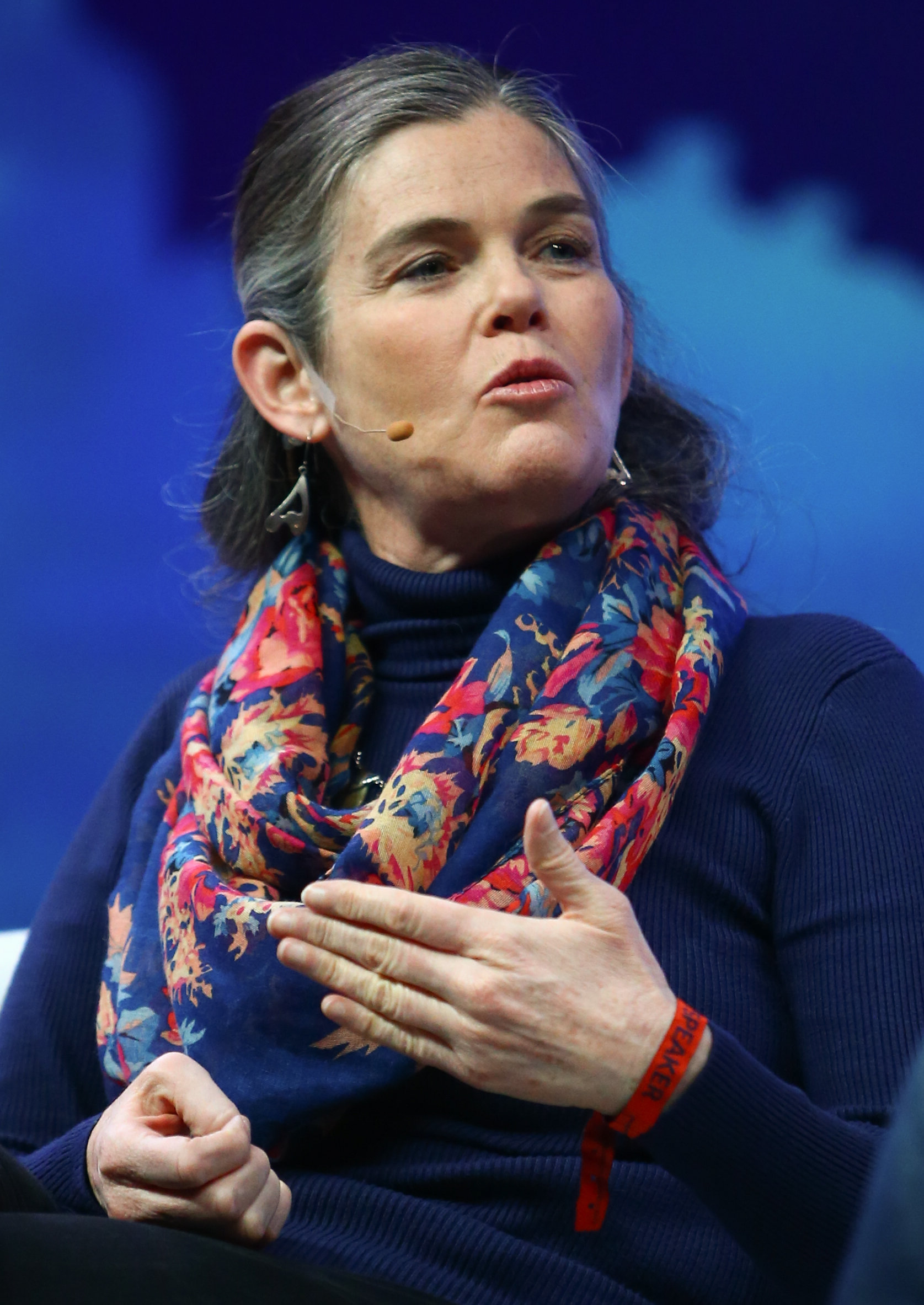
- Koller in 2019
- Born: August 27, 1968 (age 58); Jerusalem, Israel
- Education: Hebrew University of Jerusalem (BSc, MSc); Stanford University (PhD)
- Known for: Machine learning Graphical models MOOCs; Coursera
- Awards: ISCB Fellow (2017); IJCAI Computers and Thought Award (2001); MacArthur Fellow (2004); PECASE (1999); ACM Prize in Computing (2007)
- Scientific career
- Fields: Machine learning Computational biology Computer vision Artificial intelligence
- Workplaces: Stanford University; University of California, Berkeley
- Thesis: From Knowledge to Belief (1994)
- Doctoral advisor: Joseph Halpern
- Doctoral students: Lise Getoor; Carlos Guestrin; Su-In Lee; Mehran Sahami; Suchi Saria; Eran Segal; Ben Taskar
- Website: ai.stanford.edu/~koller/

Daphne Koller (Hebrew: דפנה קולר; born August 27, 1968) is an Israeli-American computer scientist. She was a professor in the department of computer science at Stanford University and a MacArthur Foundation fellowship recipient. She is one of the founders of Coursera, an online education platform. Her general research area is artificial intelligence and its applications in the biomedical sciences. Koller was featured in a 2004 article by MIT Technology Review titled "10 Emerging Technologies That Will Change Your World" concerning the topic of Bayesian machine learning.

== Early life ==
Koller was born on August 27, 1968, in Jerusalem, Israel. She received a bachelor's degree from the Hebrew University of Jerusalem in 1985, at the age of 17, and a master's degree from the same institution in 1986, at the age of 18. She completed her PhD at Stanford in 1993 under the supervision of Joseph Halpern.

== Career and research ==
External videos
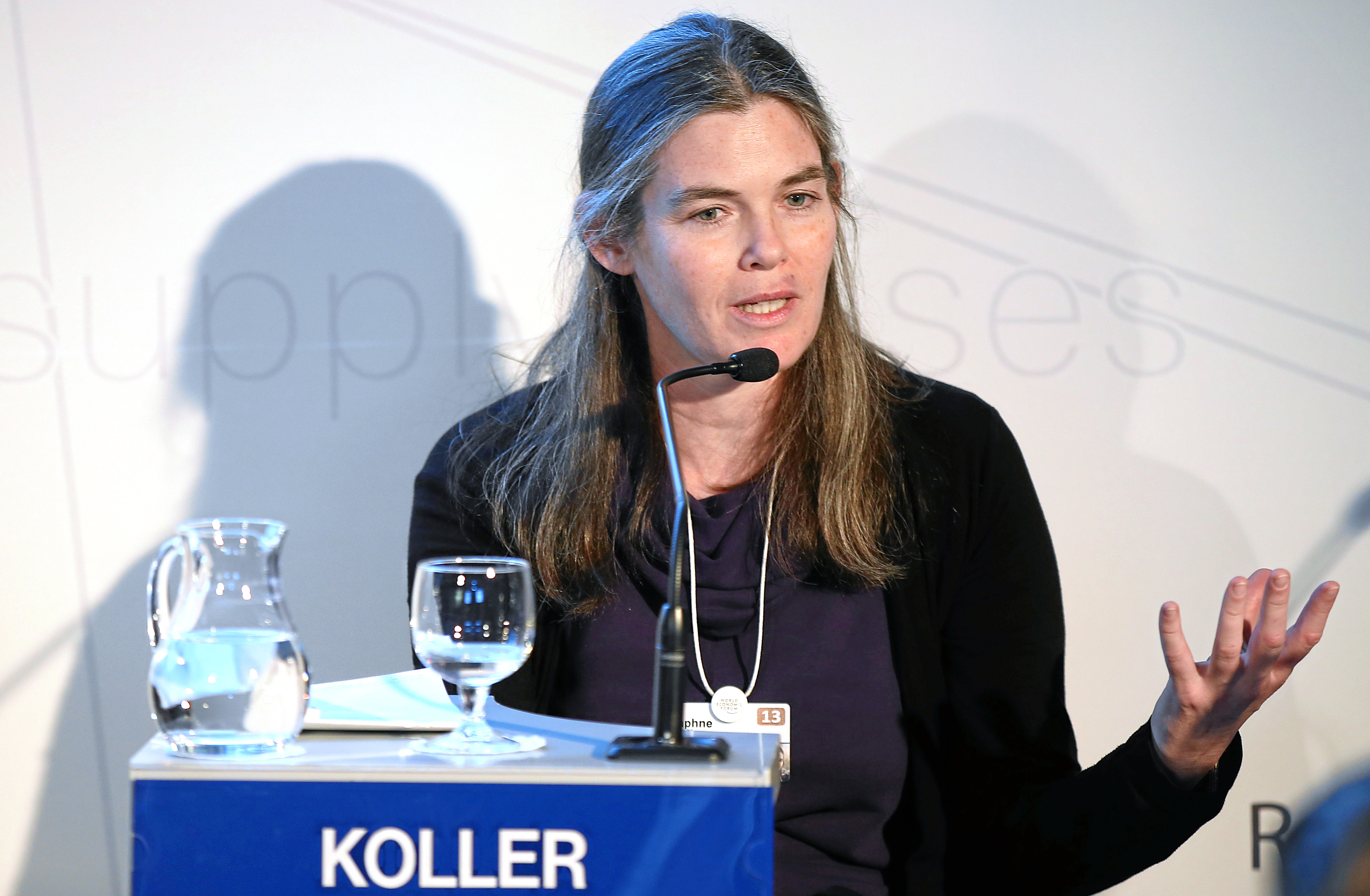
- "Daphne Koller: What we're learning from online education", TED talk, June 2012
- Daphne Koller, Co-Founder of Coursera – February 20, 2013, Darden School of Business

After her PhD, Koller did postdoctoral research at University of California, Berkeley from 1993 to 1995 under Stuart J. Russell, and joined the faculty of the Stanford University computer science department in 1995. She was named a MacArthur Fellow in 2004. She was elected a member of the National Academy of Engineering in 2011 for contributions to representation, inference, and learning in probabilistic models with applications to robotics, vision, and biology. She was also elected a fellow of the American Academy of Arts and Sciences in 2014 and as a member of the National Academy of Sciences in 2023.

In April 2008, Koller was awarded the first ever $150,000 ACM-Infosys Foundation Award in Computing Sciences.

She and Andrew Ng, a fellow Stanford computer science professor in the AI lab, founded Coursera in 2012. She served as the co-CEO with Ng, and then as president of Coursera. She was recognized for her contributions to online education by being named one of Newsweek's 10 Most Important People in 2010, Time magazine's 100 Most Influential People in 2012, and Fast Company's Most Creative People in 2014.

She left Coursera in 2016 to become chief computing officer at Calico. In 2018, she left Calico to start and lead Insitro, a drug discovery startup. The company operates an automated lab equipment running on algorithms that use its own in vitro disease models. The process allows the combination of machine learning and genomics to predict as well as test treatments for diseases.

Koller is primarily interested in representation, inference, learning, and decision making, with a focus on applications to computer vision and computational biology. Along with Suchi Saria and Anna Penn of Stanford University, Koller developed PhysiScore, which uses various data elements to predict whether premature babies are likely to have health issues.

Koller's work on artificial intelligence builds on Bayes' theorem, an 18th-century result about probability named after the mathematician Thomas Bayes. The approach underpins the process of transforming a current assumption about an event into a more accurate assumption based on more evidence. Koller is a leading figure in research that expanded the existing Bayesian-related software so that it is capable of discerning patterns in vast collections of data. In 2009, she published a textbook on probabilistic graphical models together with Nir Friedman. She offers a course on the subject.

In 2020, Koller co-founded the startup Engageli, which developed an alternative to the Zoom app. Its online learning platform addressed problems such as low student engagement, featuring what the company called as “superior” learning experience that includes real-time evaluations to determine whether students are keeping up.

Her former doctoral students include Lise Getoor, Mehran Sahami, Suchi Saria, Eran Segal, and Ben Taskar.

Koller was interviewed by BBC Radio 4 on The Life Scientific broadcast on 27 September 2022.

=== Honors and awards ===
- 1994: Arthur Samuel Thesis Award
- 1996: Sloan Foundation Faculty Fellowship
- 2004: Oswald G. Villard Fellow for Undergraduate Teaching at Stanford University
- 2008: ACM/Infosys Award
- 2013: Time magazine's 100 Most Influential People
- 2014: Fast Company's Most Creative People in Business
- 2017: Elected ISCB Fellow by the International Society for Computational Biology (ISCB)
- 2019: ACM-AAAI Allen Newell Award for contributions with significant breadth across computing, or that bridge computer science and other disciplines
- 2022: Technical Leadership Abie Award Winner
- 2023: Elected to National Academy of Sciences
- 2024: Time magazine's 100 Most Influential People in AI

== Books ==
Koller's book authorships include:

- Koller contributed one chapter to the 2018 book Architects of Intelligence: The Truth About AI from the People Building it by the American futurist Martin Ford.
- Probabilistic Graphical Models: Principles and Techniques by Daphne Koller and Nir Friedman.

== Personal life ==
Koller is married to Dan Avida, a venture capitalist at Opus Capital.
