= List of fellows of the International Society for Computational Biology =

This page lists people elected ISCB Fellow by the International Society for Computational Biology (ISCB).

== Class of 2009 ==
- David Haussler
- David Lipman
- Webb Miller
- David Sankoff
- Temple F. Smith
- Janet Thornton
- Michael Waterman

== Class of 2010 ==
- Russ Altman
- Lawrence Hunter
- Eugene Myers
- Chris Sander
- Gary Stormo
- Alfonso Valencia

== Class of 2011 ==
- Michael Ashburner
- Philip E. Bourne
- Søren Brunak
- Richard Durbin

== Class of 2012 ==
- Bonnie Berger
- Peter Karp
- Jill Mesirov
- Pavel Pevzner
- Ron Shamir
- Martin Vingron
- Gunnar von Heijne

== Class of 2013 ==
- Pierre Baldi
- David Eisenberg
- Minoru Kanehisa
- Satoru Miyano
- Ruth Nussinov
- Steven Salzberg

== Class of 2014 ==
- Amos Bairoch
- Ewan Birney
- Nir Friedman
- Robert Gentleman
- Andrej Sali

== Class of 2015 ==
- Rolf Apweiler
- Cyrus Chothia
- Julio Collado-Vides
- Mark Gerstein
- Des Higgins
- Thomas Lengauer
- Michael Levitt
- Burkhard Rost

== Class of 2016 ==
- Helen M. Berman
- Steven E. Brenner
- Dan Gusfield
- Barry Honig
- Janet Kelso
- Michal Linial
- Christine Orengo
- Aviv Regev
- Lincoln Stein
- Sarah Teichmann
- Anna Tramontano
- Shoshana Wodak
- Haim Wolfson

== Class of 2017 ==
- Alex Bateman
- Andrea Califano
- Daphne Koller
- Anders Krogh
- William S. Noble
- Lior Pachter
- Olga Troyanskaya
- Tandy Warnow

== Class of 2018 ==
- Patricia Babbitt
- Terry Gaasterland
- Hanah Margalit
- Yves Moreau
- Bernard Moret
- William Pearson
- Mona Singh
- Mike Steel

== Class of 2019 ==
- Vineet Bafna
- Eleazar Eskin
- Xiaole Shirley Liu
- Marie-France Sagot

== Class of 2020 ==
- Serafim Batzoglou
- Judith Blake
- Mark Borodovsky
- Rita Casadio
- Paul Flicek
- Osamu Gotoh
- Rafael Irizarry
- Laxmi Parida
- Katherine Pollard
- Ben Raphael
- Zhiping Weng
- Xuegong Zhang

== Class of 2021 ==
- Atul Butte
- A. Keith Dunker
- Eran Halperin
- Wolfgang Huber
- Sorin Istrail
- Christina S. Leslie
- Ming Li
- Núria López Bigas
- Dana Pe'er
- Teresa Przytycka
- Eytan Ruppin
- Gustavo Stolovitzky

== Class of 2022 ==
- Barbara Bryant
- Sean Eddy
- Mikhail Gelfand
- Takashi Gojobori
- Trey Ideker
- David Tudor Jones
- Fran Lewitter
- Jun Liu
- Debora Marks
- Mihai Pop
- Reinhard Schneider

== Class of 2023 ==
- Bissan Al-Lazikani
- Ana Conesa
- Lenore Cowen
- Arne Elofsson
- Oliver Kohlbacher
- Heng Li
- Luay Nakhleh
- Francis Ouellette
- Shoba Ranganathan
- Russell Schwartz
- Roded Sharan
- Fabian Theis
- Cathy Wu
- Jinbo Xu
- Jinghui Zhang

== Class of 2024 ==
- Teresa Attwood
- Niko Beerenwinkel
- Peer Bork
- Barbara Engelhardt
- Tao Jiang
- Carl Kingsford
- Eugene Koonin
- Doron Lancet
- Philippe Lemey
- Scott Markel
- Peter Park
- Natasa Przulj
- Torsten Schwede
- Michael Sternberg
- Fengzhu Sun
- Mihaela Zavolan

== Class of 2025 ==
- Yana Bromberg
- Charlotte Deane
- Toni Gabaldon
- Rachel Karchin
- David Landsman
- Su-In Lee
- Jian Ma
- Nicola Mulder
- Robert F. Murphy
- Itsik Pe'er
- Lucia Peixoto
- Predrag Radivojac
- Ana Tereza Ribeiro de Vasconcelos
- Remo Rohs
- Julio Saez-Rodriguez
- Cenk Sahinalp
- Donna Slonim
- Zemin Zhang
- Hongyu Zhao

== Class of 2026 ==
- Michelle Brazas
- Tulio de Oliveira
- Matthew Hahn
- Danuel Huson
- Jingyi Jessica Li
- Wei Li
- Xihong Lin
- Jennifer Listgarten
- Kenta Nakai
- Gonzalo Navarro
- Qing Nie
- Mihaela Pertea
- Sylvia Plevritis
- Sophie Schbath
- Eran Segal
- Yun S. Song
- Wing-Kin Sung
- Haixu Tang
- John Weinstein
- Eric Xing
