= Kanehisa =

Kanehisa (written: 金久) is a Japanese surname. Notable people with the surname include:

- Minoru Kanehisa (金久 實; born 1948), Japanese bioinformatician
- Tadashi Kanehisa (金久 正; 1906–1997), Japanese folklorist and linguist

Kanehisa (written: 兼久) is also a masculine Japanese given name. Notable people with the name include:

- Kanehisa Arime (有銘 兼久; born 1978), Japanese baseball player
