= Hanah Margalit =

- חנה מרגלית
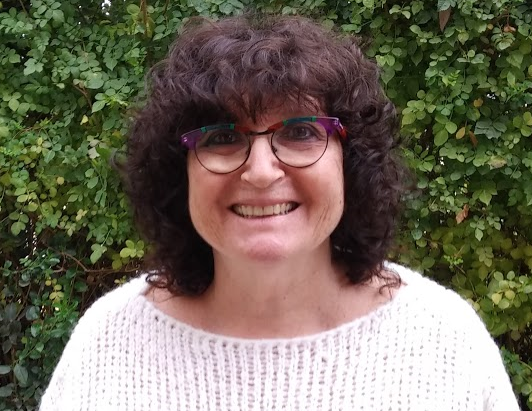
- Education: Hebrew University of Jerusalem (PhD)
- Awards: ISCB Fellow (2018); Landau Prize in Systems Biology (2008); Rothschild Prize in Computational Biology
- Scientific career
- Fields: Bioinformatics; Computational Biology; Systems Biology
- Workplaces: Hebrew University of Jerusalem; National Institutes of Health
- Doctoral advisor: Norman Grover
- Other academic advisors: Charles DeLisi
- Website: margalit.huji.ac.il

Hanah Margalit (Hebrew: חנה מרגלית) is a professor in the faculty of medicine at the Hebrew University of Jerusalem. Her research combines bioinformatics, computational biology and systems biology, specifically in the fields of gene regulation in bacteria and eukaryotes.

== Education ==
Margalit earned her BSc degree (in mathematics and biology, 1974) and MSc degree (in genetics, with distinction, 1977) from the Hebrew University of Jerusalem. In 1985, she completed her PhD in computational molecular biology, under the supervision of Norman Grover, the Hebrew University of Jerusalem.

== Career and research ==
Margalit completed postdoctoral research at the National Institutes of Health (NIH) in the laboratory of mathematical biology under the supervision of Charles DeLisi, where she developed the first computational algorithm to predict antigenic peptides recognized by immune cells. In 1989, she returned to Israel and established her independent research group at the Faculty of Medicine, the Hebrew University of Jerusalem.

Her early research included development of computational algorithms for predicting binding of antigenic peptides to MHC molecules, computational models of protein-DNA binding preferences, also in collaboration with Nir Friedman, identification of domain pairs as the building blocks of protein-protein interaction networks, analysis of the integrated network of protein-protein and protein-DNA interactions (in collaboration with Uri Alon), as well as computational models for predicting small regulatory RNA molecules in bacteria, which were verified experimentally in collaboration with Shoshy Altuvia and Gerhart Wagner.

More recently, Margalit's lab studied the dynamics of regulation by small RNAs (in collaboration with Ofer Biham), and computationally predicted that there are viral microRNA molecules that repress the human immune system, a mechanism that was experimentally validated in collaboration with Ofer Mandelboim. Since 2012, Margalit has combined experimental and computational research for studying small RNA-target interactions in bacteria.

Margalit was one of pioneering researchers of Bioinformatics and Computational Biology in Israel and worldwide. At the Hebrew University she co-founded the "Computer Science and Life Sciences" program in Bioinformatics and Computational Biology (in 1999) and the graduate "Genomics and Bioinformatics" program (in 2000). In 2002 she was elected as the first president of the Israeli Society of Bioinformatics and Computational Biology (2002-2004). Margalit has mentored over 50 graduate students, many of them holding faculty positions in bioinformatics in Israel and abroad.

=== Awards and honors ===
In 2008 she was awarded the Michael Landau prize in Systems Biology. In 2018, Margalit was elected a fellow of the International Society for Computational Biology (ISCB) for outstanding contributions to the fields of computational biology and bioinformatics. In 2020, Prof. Margalit was awarded the Rothschild Prize in Computational Biology.

== Personal life ==
Margalit is married to Avi and a mother of three children.
