= Research in Computational Molecular Biology =

Annual bioinformatics conference

- Genre: bioinformatics, computational biology, algorithms
- Frequency: Annually
- Locations: Thessaloniki, Greece (2026)
- Years active: 29
- Inaugurated: 1997
- Most recent: 2026
- Previous event: RECOMB 2025
- Next event: RECOMB 2026
- Participants: academic, industry
- Organiser: Aristotle University of Thessaloniki
- Website: recomb.org

Research in Computational Molecular Biology (RECOMB) is an annual academic conference on the subjects of bioinformatics and computational biology. The conference has been held every year since 1997 and is widely considered one of the two best international conferences in computational biology, publishing rigorously peer-reviewed papers alongside the ISMB conference. The conference is affiliated with the International Society for Computational Biology. Since the first conference, authors of accepted proceedings papers have been invited to submit a revised version to a special issue of the Journal of Computational Biology.

RECOMB was established in 1997 by Sorin Istrail, Pavel Pevzner and Michael Waterman. The first conference was held at the Sandia National Laboratories in Santa Fe, New Mexico.

A series of RECOMB Satellite meetings was established by Pavel Pevzner in 2001. These meetings cover specialist aspects of bioinformatics, including massively parallel sequencing, comparative genomics, regulatory genomics, and bioinformatics education. Today, it consists of focused meetings covering various specialized aspects of bioinformatics.

As of RECOMB 2010, the conference has included a highlights track, modeled on the success of a similar track at the ISMB conference. The highlights track features presentations of computational biology papers published in the past 18 months.

As of 2016 the conference started a partnership with Cell Systems. Each year, a subset of work accepted at RECOMB is also considered for publication in a special issue of Cell Systems devoted to RECOMB. Other RECOMB papers are invited for a short synopsis (Cell Systems Calls) in the same issue. More recently, RECOMB has also partnered with Genome Research to publish a revised version of a subset of RECOMB-accepted papers.

The RECOMB Steering Committee currently includes Bonnie Berger (chair), Vineet Bafna, Eleazar Eskin, Jian Ma, Teresa Przytycka, Cenk Sahinalp, Roded Sharan, and Martin Vingron.

== Proceedings ==
Over the years, RECOMB Proceedings were published by Springer and ACM. On the other hand, full versions of selected papers appeared in various journals. As of 2026, RECOMB began hosting a webpage to index and simplify tracking RECOMB papers, their preprints, and their journal versions at RECOMB Proceedings.

== List of conferences ==
Conference	Location	Hosting institution
RECOMB 1997	Santa Fe, United States	Sandia National Laboratories
RECOMB 1998	New York City, United States	Icahn School of Medicine at Mount Sinai
RECOMB 1999	Lyon, France	INRIA
RECOMB 2000	Tokyo, Japan	University of Tokyo
RECOMB 2001	Montreal, Canada	Université de Montréal
RECOMB 2002	Washington, D.C., United States	Celera Corporation
RECOMB 2003	Berlin, Germany	Federal Ministry of Education and Research
RECOMB 2004	San Diego, United States	University of California, San Diego
RECOMB 2005	Cambridge, United States	Broad Institute
RECOMB 2006	Venice, Italy	University of Padua
RECOMB 2007	San Francisco, United States	California Institute for Quantitative Biosciences (QB3)
RECOMB 2008	Singapore	National University of Singapore
RECOMB 2009	Tucson, United States	University of Arizona
RECOMB 2010	Lisbon, Portugal	Instituto Superior Técnico
RECOMB 2011	Vancouver, Canada	Simon Fraser University
RECOMB 2012	Barcelona, Spain	Centre for Genomic Regulation
RECOMB 2013	Beijing, China	Tsinghua University
RECOMB 2014	Pittsburgh, United States	Carnegie Mellon University and University of Pittsburgh
RECOMB 2015	Warsaw, Poland	University of Warsaw
RECOMB 2016	Santa Monica, United States	University of California, Los Angeles
RECOMB 2017	Hong Kong, China	The University of Hong Kong and The Chinese University of Hong Kong
RECOMB 2018	Paris, France	Ecole Polytechnique (Sorbonne University, Jussieu campus)
RECOMB 2019	Washington, D.C., United States	The George Washington University
RECOMB 2020	Padua, Italy	University of Padova
RECOMB 2022	La Jolla, United States	University of California, San Diego
RECOMB 2023	Istanbul, Turkey	Bilkent University, Koç University
RECOMB 2024	Boston, United States	Massachusetts Institute of Technology and Tufts University
RECOMB 2025	Seoul, South Korea	Seoul National University and Yonsei University
RECOMB 2026	Thessaloniki, Greece	Aristotle University of Thessaloniki

== See also ==
- Intelligent Systems for Molecular Biology (ISMB)
- European Conference on Computational Biology (ECCB)
- European Conference on Machine Learning and Principles and Practice of Knowledge Discovery in Databases (ECML PKDD)
- International Conference on Computational Intelligence Methods for Bioinformatics and Biostatistics (CIBB)
