= Japanese Society for Bioinformatics =

Japanese research society

- Abbreviation: JSBi
- Formation: 1999
- Type: Learned society
- Members: 512 (2018)
- President: Wataru Iwasaki
- Affiliations: International Society for Computational Biology
- Website: www.jsbi.org/en/

The Japanese Society for Bioinformatics (JSBi) is a Japanese research society on the subjects of bioinformatics and computational biology established in 1999. The society is an affiliated regional group of the International Society for Computational Biology (ISCB), and a member of Association of Asian Societies for Bioinformatics (AASBi). Supporting corporate members include the Japanese companies Hitachi, Fujitsu and Shionogi.

Since 2001, the JSBi and Oxford University Press have awarded the Japanese Society for Bioinformatics Prize for outstanding young scientists in bioinformatics.

== Presidents ==
The following people have been president of the JSBi:

1. Minoru Kanehisa, Kyoto University (1999–2004)
2. Satoru Miyano, The University of Tokyo (2004–2005)
3. Yukihiro Eguchi, Mitsui Knowledge Industry Co., Ltd (2005–2006)
4. Kenta Nakai, The University of Tokyo (2006–2008)
5. Osamu Gotoh, Kyoto University (2008–2010)
6. Hideo Matsuda, Osaka University (2010–2013)
7. Kiyoshi Asai (scientist), The University of Tokyo (2013–2015)
8. Kentaro Shimizu (scientist), The University of Tokyo (2015–2017)
9. Kengo Kinoshita, Tohoku University (2017–2019)
10. Wataru Iwasaki, The University of Tokyo (2019–)
