= Vineet Bafna =

Professor

- Education: Pennsylvania State University (PhD); Indian Institute of Technology
- Awards: ISCB Fellow (2019)
- Scientific career
- Fields: Bioinformatics, Computational biology
- Institutions: University of California San Diego
- Thesis: Approximation algorithms for multiple alignment and genome rearrangements (1994)
- Doctoral advisor: Pavel Pevzner
- Website: http://proteomics.ucsd.edu/vbafna/

Vineet Bafna is an Indian bioinformatician and professor of computer science and director of bioinformatics program at University of California, San Diego. He was elected a Fellow of the International Society for Computational Biology (ISCB) in 2019 for outstanding contributions to the fields of computational biology and bioinformatics. He has also been a member of the Research in Computational Molecular Biology (RECOMB) conference steering committee.

== Career and research ==
Bafna received his Ph.D. in computer science from Pennsylvania State University in 1994 under supervision of Pavel Pevzner, and was a post-doctoral researcher at Center for Discrete Mathematics and Theoretical Computer Science. From 1999 to 2002, he worked at Celera Genomics, ultimately as director of informatics research, where he was part of the team (along with J. Craig Venter and Gene Myers) who assembled and annotated the Human Genome in 2001. He was also a member of the team that published the first diploid (six-billion-letter) genome of an individual human in 2007.

He joined the faculty at the University of California, San Diego in the Department of Computer Science and Engineering in 2003 where he now serves as professor and director of Bioinformatics program.

== Awards ==
- ACM Fellow (2023)
- ICSB Fellow (2019)
