= Rolf Apweiler =

German bioinformatician

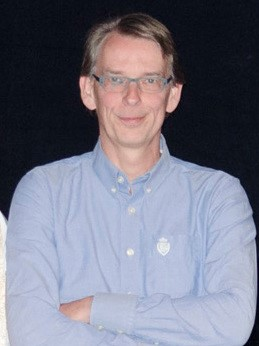
- Rolf Apweiler in 2015.
- Education: Heidelberg University; University of Bath
- Known for: Swiss-Prot; TrEMBL; UniProt; InterPro
- Awards: EMBO Member (2012); ISCB Fellow (2015)
- Scientific career
- Fields: Bioinformatics; Biochemistry; Proteomics
- Workplaces: EMBL-EBI; Heidelberg University
- Thesis: Characterization of the effect of (-) - 2- (4-methylphenoxy) -7- (4-chlorophenyl) -heptanoic acid on insulin sensitivity and glucose tolerance of FA-FA and FA -? - Rats (1994)
- Website: www.ebi.ac.uk/people/person/rolf-apweiler

Rolf Apweiler is a German bioinformatician who was director and associate director of European Bioinformatics Institute (EBI) part of the European Molecular Biology Laboratory (EMBL) with Ewan Birney.

== Education ==
Apweiler gained his PhD in biochemistry from Heidelberg University.

== Research ==
Apweiler has been working on the Swiss-Prot protein sequence database since 1987, and in 1994 he became leader of the Swiss-Prot group. He has been joint head of the Protein and Nucleotide Data (PANDA) Group since 2007. The PANDA group is involved in several international collaborations like the Human Proteome Organization (HUPO) Proteomics Standards Initiative. Apweiler is a member of the Nomenclature Committee of IUBMB, the FlyBase advisory board, the committee of the Helmholtz Centre for Infection Research (HZI) and the advisory board of the Human Proteome Resource (HPR).

Apweiler is an editor of the FEBS Journal and a section editor of BMC Bioinformatics and has published more than 200 papers.

=== Awards and honours ===
Apweiler was elected a member of the European Molecular Biology Organization (EMBO) in 2012, elected a Fellow of the International Society for Computational Biology in 2015 and elected a member of the Academia Europaea in 2022.

Academic offices
Preceded by Janet Thornton	Director of the European Bioinformatics Institute; 2015–present	Incumbent
