= Camilla Pang =

British computational biologist

- Born: Camilla Sih Mai Pang; February 1992 (age 34)
- Other name: Millie Pang
- Education: Wycliffe College, Gloucestershire
- Alma mater: University of Bristol (BSc); University College London (PhD)
- Awards: Royal Society Prize for Science Books (2020)
- Scientific career
- Workplaces: University College London
- Thesis: Developing a computational approach to investigate the impacts of disease-causing mutations on protein function. (2018)
- Doctoral advisor: Christine Orengo
- Website: www.camillapang.com

Camilla Sih Mai Pang (born February 1992) is a British computational biologist, writer, and autism advocate. In 2020, she was awarded the Royal Society Prize for Science Books for her memoir, Explaining Humans: What Science Can Teach Us about Life, Love and Relationships.

== Early life and education ==
Pang has said that she was not a typical child, and evaluated her early friendships in terms of computer code. At the age of eight Pang was diagnosed with autism spectrum disorder, and asked her mother whether there was an instruction manual for life. Pang attended Wycliffe College, Gloucestershire. She studied mathematics, physics, biology and art for GCE Advanced Level. Pang joined the University of Bristol as an undergraduate student, where she specialised in biochemistry. She earned a PhD in computational biology at University College London where her research was supervised by Christine Orengo.

== Career ==
After earning her doctorate, Pang joined a pharmaceutical company as a postdoctoral researcher. Her research considers the computational model of disease in an effort to identify new pharmaceutical options for neurological diseases.

In 2020 Pang released her first book, Explaining Humans: What Science Can Teach Us about Life, Love and Relationships. The book explores what it means to be human, discussing social etiquette, relationships and perfectionism.

Alongside her scientific research, Pang looks to inspire young people to study science. She has spoken openly about her neurodiversity, and campaigned for increased awareness of autism amongst young women.

=== Awards and honours ===
Pang was awarded the Royal Society Prize for Science Books in 2020 for her memoir Explaining Humans: What Science Can Teach Us about Life, Love and Relationships.

== Personal life ==
At the age of twenty six, Pang was diagnosed with attention deficit hyperactivity disorder (ADHD).
