= Yana Bromberg =

American computational biologist

- Born: Odessa, Ukraine
- Education: Stony Brook University (BA, BEng); Columbia University (MPhil, PhD)
- Known for: SNAP neural network-based method for predicting effects of genetic variants on protein function
- Awards: ISCB Fellow (2025); NSF CAREER Award (2016); Hans Fischer Fellow, TUM Institute for Advanced Study, Technical University of Munich (2014-2017)
- Scientific career
- Fields: Computational biology, Bioinformatics, Machine learning, Metagenomics
- Workplaces: Rutgers University (2010-2022), Emory University (2023- )
- Thesis: Prediction and analysis of effects of non-synonymous single nucleotide polymorphisms on (product) protein function (2006)
- Doctoral advisor: Burkhard Rost
- Website: bromberglab.org

Yana Bromberg is an American computational biologist and professor of bioinformatics at Emory University. She is recognized as a pioneer in applying machine learning for genomic analysis, particularly for developing SNAP (Screening for Non-Acceptable Polymorphisms), a neural network-based method that predicts functional effects of single amino acid substitutions, resulting from missense SNPs, on protein function. Her current research focuses on understanding how protein language model (pLM) embeddings capture biological information and whether these computational representations truly encode the underlying principles of molecular biology.

== Early life and education ==
Yana Bromberg was born in Odessa, Ukraine and moved to Brooklyn, New York, in 1992. Bromberg graduated Brooklyn Technical High School in 1997. She then obtained a BA in biology and a BEng in computer science from Stony Brook University in 2001. Her MPhil (2004) and PhD (2007) in biomedical informatics were from Columbia University.

== Career and research ==
Bromberg started her academic career as an Assistant Professor of Bioinformatics at the Rutgers School of Environmental and Biological Sciences (2010). She finally joined the faculty at Emory University as a Full Professor in 2023. She holds joint appointments in the departments of Biology and Computer Science and serves as a principal fellow at the Center for AI Learning.

Bromberg's research primarily focuses on building machine learning and artificial intelligence -based methods for understanding of the origins of life, annotation of the microbiome functionality, genetic variant impact and protein function prediction. Her lab develops novel bioinformatics techniques integrating machine learning, high-performance computing, and large-scale genomic and metagenomic analysis, with particular emphasis on protein molecular functions.

SNAP (published in 2007), developed as part of her doctoral work, was one of the first tools to use neural networks for the analysis of genomic variants (here, non-synonymous SNPs). Her lab had since developed SynVep, a machine learning-based predictor for evaluating the impact of synonymous variants. Recently, the Bromberglab had demonstrated that unsupervised pLMs can be used to predict variant effects as well as earlier, supervised methods, albeit no existing model attains perfect understanding of variant impact.

A central theme of her recent work is investigating what biological information is captured by pLMs. To this end, her lab has developed the RNS method to quantify the uncertainty in protein representations, indicative of their ability to genuinely encode protein biology.

== Awards and honours ==
Bromberg was awarded a National Science Foundation CAREER Award in 2016. She was then named a Hans Fischer Fellows by the Technical University of Munich TUM Institute for Advanced Study (2014-2017). Other honors include the Theobald Smith Society Young Investigator Award (2016) and the Rutgers Board of Trustees Research Fellowship for Scholarly Excellence (2016),

In 2025, Bromberg was named by the International Society for Computational Biology (ISCB) as an ISCB Fellow.

== Selected talks ==
- "The Big YOU: Defining 'you' on the Microbial Level" - TEDxRutgers (2019)
- "Yana Bromberg on getting creative with machine learning" - Night Science Podcast (June 2021)
- Function SIG presentation - ISMB/ECCB 2023, Lyon, France (July 2023)
- 3DSIG presentation - ISMB 2024, Montreal, Canada (July 2024)
