= Nicola Mulder =

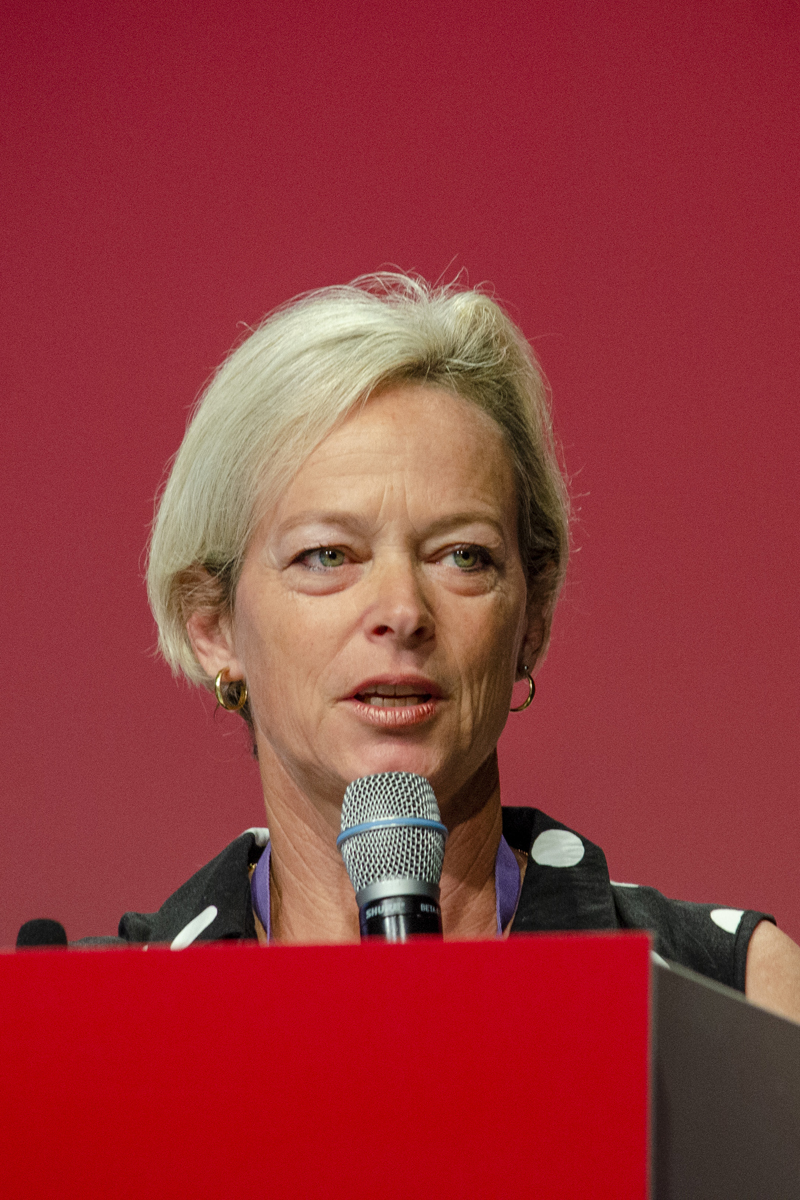
- Nicola Mulder at the ISMB/ECCB conference in 2019.
- Awards: Fellow of the African Academy of Sciences (2018); ISCB Fellow (2025)
- Scientific career
- Institutions: University of Cape Town
- Thesis: Identification and characterisation of transcriptional regulatory proteins from Mycobacterium tuberculosis (1998)

Nicola J Mulder is a professor and head of the computational biology division at the University of Cape Town, South Africa. She is also a principal investigator at H3ABioNet, a pan-African bioinformatics network for human heredity and health.

== Education ==
Mulder graduated with a bachelor degree in chemistry and microbiology, and an honours degree in microbiology. She received her PhD from the University of Cape Town in 1998; her thesis subject was identifying and characterizing transcriptional regulatory proteins from Mycobacterium tuberculosis.

== Career and research ==
After graduating, Mulder spent 8 years working at the European Bioinformatics Institute, where she was a team leader responsible for the development of InterPro and the Gene Ontology Annotation Project. Mulder was appointed associate professor and head of the computational biology division (CBIO) at the University of Cape Town in 2009; she was promoted to full professor in 2014. Her research interests include microbial genomics and studying African population genetic diversity.

== Awards and honours ==
Mulder was elected to the University of Cape Town College of Fellows in 2016. In 2018, she was elected Fellow of the African Academy of Sciences. In 2025, she was named by the International Society for Computational Biology (ISCB) as an ISCB Fellow.
