= Donna Slonim =

American computational biologist

Donna Karen Slonim is an American computer scientist and computational biologist focusing on computational genomics with applications in gene regulation, precision medicine, and drug discovery. She is a professor of computer science at Tufts University, with a secondary appointment as a professor of immunology.

== Education and career ==
Slonim majored in computer science at Yale University, graduating in 1990. After receiving a master's degree in computer science from the University of California, Berkeley, in 1991, she completed her Ph.D. at the Massachusetts Institute of Technology in 1996. Her dissertation, Learning from Imperfect Data in Theory and Practice, concerned computational learning theory, and was supervised by Ron Rivest.

She became a researcher at the Whitehead Institute Center for Genome Research from 1996 to 2000, and for Wyeth in the former Genetics Institute from 2000 to 2004. In 2005 she returned to academia as an associate professor of computer science at Tufts University; she was promoted to full professor in 2016. She has also held visiting positions at Boston Children's Hospital and the Broad Institute.

== Recognition ==
Slonim was named as a Fellow of the International Society for Computational Biology in 2025, recognizing research that has "pioneered the application of machine learning to transcriptomics and disease research, particularly in maternal and fetal health".
