= Roger Gray (judge) =

English cricketer and barrister

Personal information
- Full name: Roger Ibbotson Gray
- Born: 16 June 1921; Headingley, Yorkshire, England
- Died: 19 October 1992 (aged 71); Cheltenham, Gloucestershire, England
- Batting: Right-handed
- Bowling: Right-arm medium

Domestic team information
- Years: Team
- 1947: Oxford University

Career statistics
Competition	First-class
Matches	1
Runs scored	11
Batting average	5.50
100s/50s	–/–
Top score	11
Balls bowled	138
Wickets	0
Bowling average	–
5 wickets in innings	–
10 wickets in match	–
Best bowling	–
Catches/stumpings	1/–
- Source: Cricinfo, 12 May 2020

Roger Ibbotson Gray QC (16 June 1921 – 19 October 1992) was an English judge, barrister and first-class cricketer .

Gray was born at Headingley in June 1921. He was educated at Wycliffe College in Gloucestershire, before going up to The Queen's College, Oxford. His studies at Oxford were interrupted by the Second World War, with Gray being commissioned in June 1942 as a second lieutenant in the Royal Artillery. He served with the Ayrshire Yeomanary in the war, seeing action in Normandy and North-West Europe. After the war he returned to complete his studies at Oxford, during which he made a single appearance in first-class cricket for Oxford University against the Free Foresters at Oxford in 1947. Batting twice in the match, he was dismissed without scoring in the Oxford first innings by John Brocklebank, while in their second innings he was dismissed for 11 runs by Rowland Shaddick. He was president of the Oxford Union in 1948–49.

After graduating from Oxford with a first in jurisprudence, Gray became a barrister as a member of Gray's Inn. He stood as the Conservative candidate in the safe Labour seat of Dagenham in the 1955 general election, losing by over 20,000 votes to John Parker. His Bar commitments did not allow him to find sufficient time to be placed in a more winnable seat and further his political aspirations. Throughout the 1960s he built a considerable practice as a junior in probate, before being appointed a Queen's Counsel in 1967. He was appointed a recorder in 1972, sitting as a Deputy High Court Judge in the Family Division. Gray died at Cheltenham in October 1992 following illness. He was survived by his wife and his son from his first marriage.
