= Lucia Peixoto =

Uruguayan-American biochemist and neuroscientist

Lucía Peixoto is a Uruguayan-American biochemist and neuroscientist whose research concerns the genomic and biomolecular basis of sleep, memory, and autism. She is an associate professor in the Department of Translational Medicine and Physiology of the Elson S. Floyd College of Medicine at Washington State University.

== Education and career ==
Peixoto received a bachelor's degree in biochemistry from the University of the Republic (Uruguay) in 2002. She completed a Ph.D. in biology in 2009 at the University of Pennsylvania, under the supervision of David S. Roos.

After continuing at the University of Pennsylvania for postdoctoral research in neuroscience, and interning at the Children’s Hospital of Philadelphia, she joined the Washington State University Department of Translational Medicine and Physiology as an assistant professor in 2015. She was promoted to associate professor there in 2023.

== Recognition ==
Peixoto was the 2025 recipient of the society's Outstanding Contributions to ISCB Award, recognizing contributions including STEM outreach and serving as the founding chair of the society's Equity, Diversity, and Inclusion committee. She was also named as a Fellow of the International Society for Computational Biology in 2025, recognizing both her service and research accomplishments.
