= Li Wei =

Li Wei or Wei Li may refer to:

== People surnamed Li ==
- Li Wei (Tang dynasty) (died 879), Tang dynasty chief minister
- Li Wei (Qing dynasty) (1687–1738), Qing dynasty mandarin

=== Politicians ===
- Li Wei (politician, born 1953), former director of the Development Research Center of the State Council
- Li Wei (politician, born 1956), former Vice Minister of Public Security of the People's Republic of China
- Li Wei (politician, born 1958), People's Republic of China politician in Beijing
- Li Wei (politician, born 1963), Chinese politician
- Li Wei (politician, born 1970), People's Republic of China politician in Jiangxi

=== Academics ===
- Li Wei (computer scientist) (1943–2026), Chinese computer scientist and president of Beijing University of Aeronautics and Astronautics
- Li Wei (linguist), Chinese-born linguist at Birkbeck, University of London

=== Artists and entertainers ===
- Li Wei (actor) (1919–2005), Chinese actor
- Li Wei (artist) (born 1970), Chinese contemporary artist
- Lee Wei (born 1980), Taiwanese singer and actor

=== Generals ===
- Li Wei (major general, born 1914), founding major general (Shaojiang) of the People's Liberation Army (PLA) of China
- Li Wei (general, born 1960), general (Shangjiang) of the People's Liberation Army (PLA) of China and the current Political Commissar of the People's Liberation Army Strategic Support Force

=== Sportspeople ===
- Li Wei (speed skater) (born 1961), Chinese male speed skater
- Li Wei (figure skater) (born 1969), Chinese male figure skater
- Li Wei (footballer, born 1975), Chinese male football goalkeeper and coach
- Li Wei (field hockey) (born 1978), Chinese male field hockey player
- Li Wei (swimmer) (born 1979), Chinese female swimmer
- Li Wei (footballer, born 1985), Chinese male footballer

== People surnamed Wei ==
- Wei Li (runner) (born 1972), Chinese female long-distance runner

== See also ==
- Tuoba Liwei or Liwei (174–277), Xianbei chieftain during the Three Kingdoms and Jin dynasties
