= Mark Borodovsky =

American biologist

- Education: Moscow Institute of Physics and Technology
- Known for: GeneMark
- Awards: ISCB Fellow (2020)
- Scientific career
- Fields: Bioinformatics
- Workplaces: Georgia Institute of Technology; Emory University; Moscow Institute of Physics and Technology

Mark Borodovsky (Russian: Марк Бородовский) is a Regents' Professor at the Join Wallace H. Coulter Department of Biomedical Engineering of Georgia Institute of Technology and Emory University and Director of the Center for Bioinformatics and Computational Genomics at Georgia Tech. He has also been a Chair of the Department of Bioinformatics at the Moscow Institute of Physics and Technology in Moscow, Russia from 2012 to 2022.

Borodovsky is a Founder of the Georgia Tech graduate Program in Bioinformatics (M.Sc. and Ph.D.), a Member of Educational Committee of the International Society of Computational Biology, as well as organizer of eleven International Conferences in Bioinformatics held at Georgia Tech starting 1997.

== Research ==
Borodovsky started research in Bioinformatics at the Institute of Molecular Genetics USSR Academy of Sciences in 1985. In 1986 he introduced use of inhomogeneous Markov chain models for efficient modeling of protein-coding regions; this approach became a standard feature of gene finding algorithms. In 1990 he established a bioinformatics lab at Georgia Institute of Technology in Atlanta. Borodovsky has made many contributions in the area of development of gene finding algorithms, notably the GeneMark program (1993) that made an impact in the field and was used for annotation of the first completely sequenced genomes of Haemophilus influenzae and Methanococcus jannaschii. First hand experience in a number of genome projects motivated further development of advanced algorithms applicable to viral, prokaryotic, eukaryotic genomes and metagenomes. These algorithms are currently in use in many research labs in the US and abroad as well as at the major sequencing and annotation centers, such as the Broad Institute, DOE Joint Genome Institute and NIH National Center for Biotechnology Information.

== Education ==
Borodovsky received his Master of Science in Physics and Operation Research and PhD in Applied Mathematics (1976) from the Moscow Institute of Physics and Technology.

== Honours ==
Borodovsky was elected a Fellow of the International Society for Computational Biology in 2020.
