= Wycliffe College, Gloucestershire =

Coordinates: 51°44′37″N 2°16′47″W

Wycliffe College

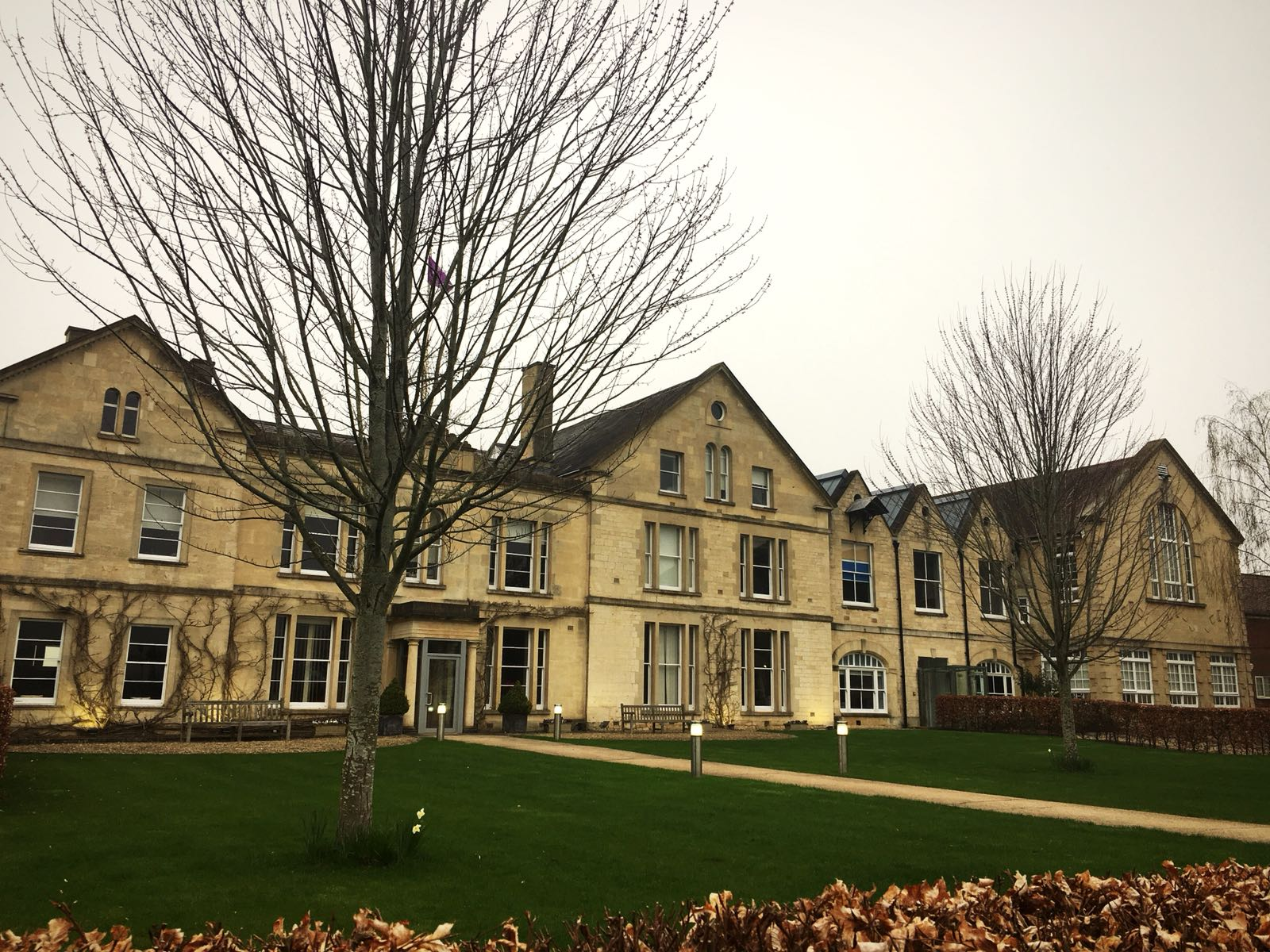
- The main school house building on the senior school campus at Wycliffe College

Location
- Bath Road; Stonehouse, Gloucestershire, GL10 2JQ; England

Information
- Type: Private School; Independent school Co-educational; Boarding
- Motto: Bold and Loyal
- Religious affiliation: Church of England
- Established: 1882
- Founder: G. W. Sibly
- Ofsted: Reports
- Chairman of Governors: Simon Lloyd
- Headmaster: Christian San José
- Staff: 329 (including trustees)
- Gender: Co-educational
- Age: 3 to 19
- Enrolment: Approximately 630
- Houses: Senior School; Collingwood; Haywardsend; Ivy Grove; Haywardsfield; Ward's; Robinson; Loosley Halls; Lampeter Prep School; Grenfell; Lincoln; Shaftesbury; Scott
- Colours: Red, Black (Traditional) Purple, Grey (Contemporary)
- Publication: Wycliffe Times; The Wycliffian
- Former pupils: Old Wycliffians (OWs)
- Affiliations: Headmasters' and Headmistresses' Conference
- Website: http://www.wycliffe.co.uk

Wycliffe College is a private, co-educational, fee-charging, boarding and day school in Stonehouse, Gloucestershire, England, founded in 1882 by G. W. Sibly. It comprises a Pre-Prep (including Nursery) School for ages 3–6, a Prep School for ages 7–13, and a Senior School for ages 13–18. In total, there are approximately 630 pupils currently enrolled at the school. The College is set in 60 acres of land. In 2018, The Duchess of Gloucester officially opened a new £6 million boarding house named Ward's-Ivy Grove. The College attracts pupils from many areas of the world.

Wycliffe is a member school of The Headmasters' and Headmistresses' Conference (HMC). The Good Schools Guide stated that Wycliffe is "A school which offers a way of life as much as an education...A real gem of a school." The Independent Schools Inspectorate rated Wycliffe as Excellent in all areas in its most recent inspection (March 2023).

== Nursery School ==
The Nursery, which first opened in 1983 at the Grove, and was originally located within the same grounds as the Preparatory School boarding houses and sports fields. The Grove, a house built of Cotswold stone, was destroyed by fire in 1994. In 2012 the nursery school split into the nursery and pre-prep departments, the latter being moved to join with the Preparatory school.

== The Prep School ==
The Prep School has extensive sports grounds separated by a main road from the main campus. The pupils use a specially built bridge to cross over the road safely. The Prep School has two boarding houses: Pennwood and Windrush.

== The Senior School ==
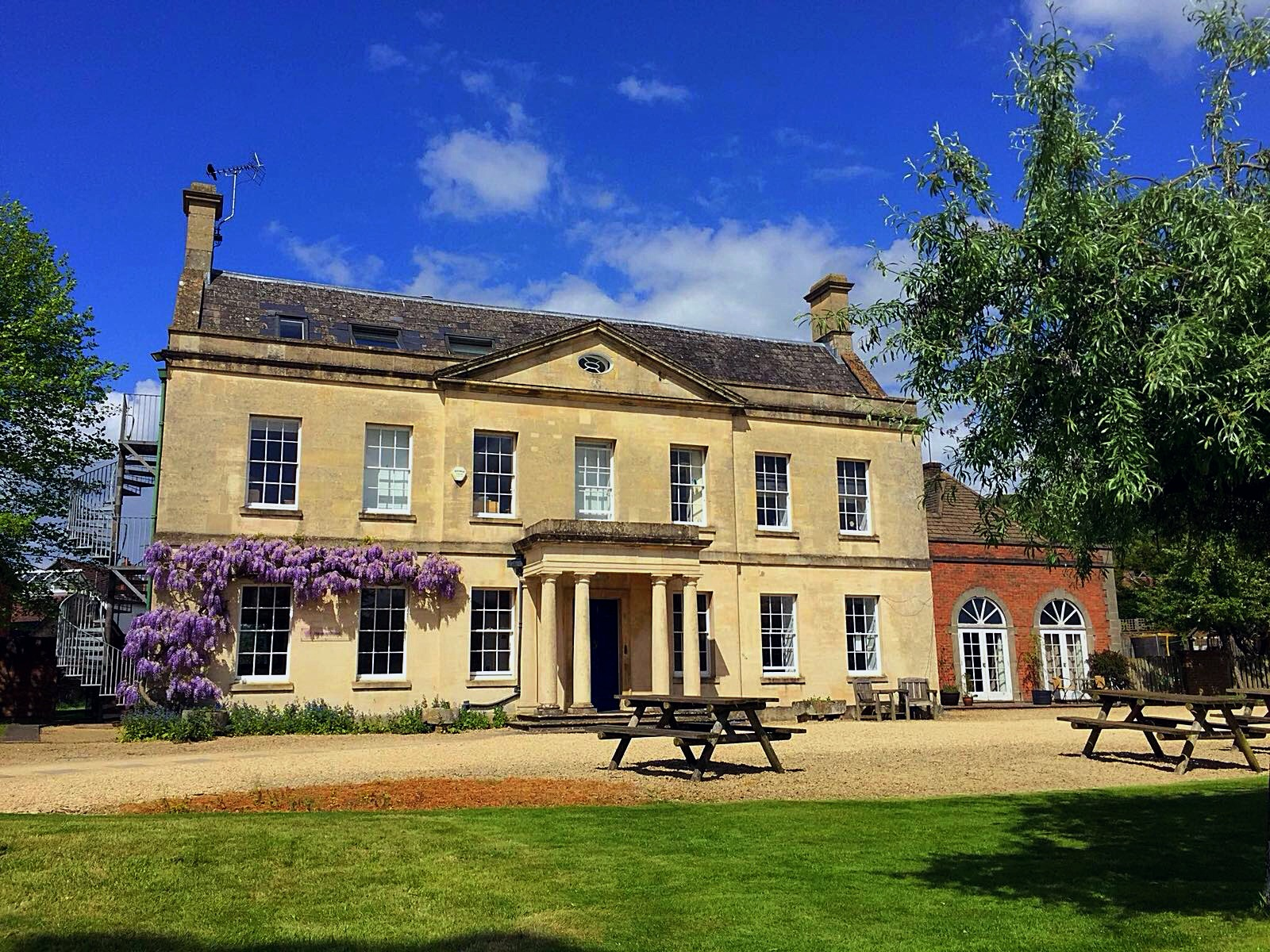
Haywardsend, a girls’ boarding house at the Wycliffe Senior School.

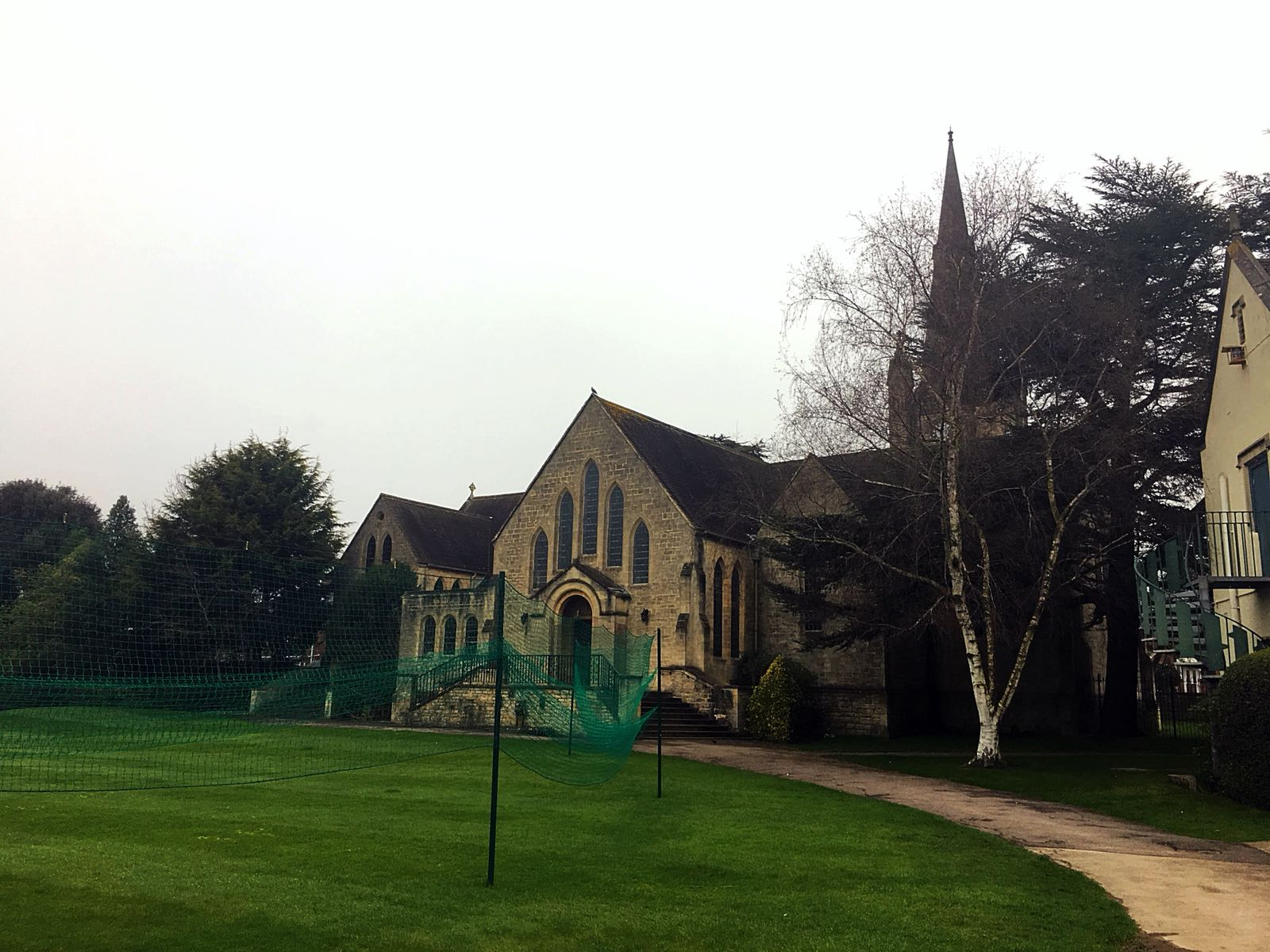
The Wycliffe Chapel.

The Senior School is located a short walk away from the Preparatory School. With over 400 students, the Senior School is the largest campus of the three. The main reception is located in School House – the principal building in the College.

Students are separated into eight different houses. With the exceptions of Collingwood House, a mixed house for day pupils, and Loosley, a mixed sixth form boarding house, the houses are single gender boarding houses. One of the school's boarding houses, Haywardsend, is one of the town's oldest buildings, an old Tudor farmhouse. Haywardsfield, an imposing three-story red brick house at the head of the school drive, is the school's oldest boarding house. The newest boarding house, Wards-Ivy Grove, completed in 2017, was designed as split gender houses: Wards and Ivy Grove, with a future-proof design feature allowing it to rapidly convert to single gender accommodation whenever required.

Sibly Hall, named in honour of the school's founder, is the school's main function hall. The school's music department is a dedicated building located near the centre of the senior campus.

In 1911, a Wesleyan chapel was built in the grounds of Wycliffe College; although built with money subscribed by those connected with the school and mainly used by the school, it was also the chapel of the local Methodist community. A tower and spire were added in 1921. The chapel was gutted by fire in 1939 and rebuilt in the late 1950s, with much of the stone coming from the church at Frocester. Its tower is Grade II listed. The chapel holds popular and well attended annual Christmas Carol Services for the school and local community.

== Accreditation ==
The school is the first independent school in the country to have achieved recognition with National Academy for Able Children in Education (NACE). The school has also achieved 'CReSTeD' accreditation for teaching dyslexic pupils. A 2010 Ofsted inspection report on the School's capability to help children to achieve well and enjoy what they do rated the provision as outstanding, noting the "extensive support networks for all boarders within the school".

== Sport ==
Wycliffe is a major squash-playing school, due to their continuous success in the squash court. The school currently holds many national squash titles, and it is also the first school to hold both the U15 and U19 National titles at the same time. Old Wycliffians have also gone on to represent their home nations in international events such as the Commonwealth Games. Among other options, pupils may choose squash as either a games option or an extra-curricular activity.

Since 1935, Wycliffe's Boat Club has had a boathouse of its own, located at Saul Junction on the Gloucester-Sharpness Canal with around 30 km of still training water.

== Curriculum ==
The academic structure targets exams of both standard English curriculum GCSE and the International GCSE, and A-level subjects at the standard English curriculum. The school currently offers 21 subject choices at GCSE, and 27 at Sixth Form level. Other activities include a Combined Cadet Force and a Duke of Edinburgh Award scheme. Extracurricular activities include: Horse riding club, Fencing club, Cryptology club, Science club, Beekeeping, Shooting, Model United Nations among many others.

Here are the latest academic results:

GCSE Results (2022):

- 35% achieved grades 9-7.

A Level Results (2022):

- 43% attained grades A/A*.
- 64% secured grades A-B*.

== Notable alumni ==
Notable Old Wycliffians include:

- Charlie Barnett (cricketer), (1910–1993), Gloucestershire and England cricketer
- Ananda Coomaraswamy (1877–1947), philosopher and art historian
- William Wasbrough Foster DSO CMG, Canadian businessman, Police and Army officer
- Brian Fothergill (1921–1990), biographer
- Alex Gidman Gloucestershire and England A cricket captain
- Roger Gray (1921–1992), High Court judge and first-class cricketer
- Sir Michael Graydon, Chief of the Air Staff of the Royal Air Force (1992–1997)
- Jeffrey Harborne, phytochemist
- Somerville Hastings (1878–1967), surgeon and politician
- Ernest William Jones (1870 - 1941), first-class cricketer and international chartered shipbroker
- Denis Malone, Chief Justice of Belize and later the Cayman Islands
- John May, Vice-Chairman of the World Scout Committee, Secretary General of the Duke of Edinburgh's Award
- William Moseley, actor.
- Jeremy Nicholas (Woolcock) - actor, writer, broadcaster, musician
- Mike Osborne, jazz musician.
- Camilla Pang, computational biologist and author.
- Gilbert Parkhouse, Glamorgan and England cricketer.
- Ben Parkin, Member of Parliament for Stroud (1945–50) Paddington North (1953–69)
- Tim Payne, England rugby player
- Mark Porter, medical doctor and media person.
- Charlie Sharples, Gloucester rugby winger.
- Sir Franklin Sibly (1883–1948), geologist and university administrator.
- Jon Silkin, poet
- Sir William Stanier, railway engineer
- Charlie Stayt, presenter of BBC Breakfast on BBC One
- Al Stewart, singer-songwriter, notable for his 1976 world wide hit record 'Year of the Cat'
- Jun Tanaka, chef and author
- Geoffrey Tovey, serologist and founder of UK Transplant service
- John Duncan, Governor of the British Virgin Islands
