= David T. Jones (biochemist) =

British bioinformatician

David Jones
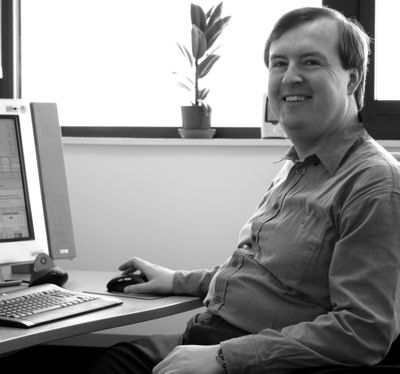
- David Jones in 2006
- Born: David Tudor Jones; November 1966 (age 59)
- Education: University College London (PhD); King's College London (MSc); Imperial College London (BSc)
- Known for: Protein Fold Recognition; Protein Structure Prediction
- Awards: Royal Society University Research Fellowship (1995–1999)
- Scientific career
- Fields: Bioinformatics; Protein structure; Computational biology
- Workplaces: University College London; Birkbeck, University of London
- Thesis: Structural approaches to protein sequence analysis (1993)
- Doctoral advisor: William R. Taylor; Janet Thornton
- Website: http://www.cs.ucl.ac.uk/staff/d.jones/

David Tudor Jones FRS (born 1966) is a Professor of Bioinformatics, and Head of Bioinformatics Group in the University College London. He is also the director in Bloomsbury Center for Bioinformatics, which is a joint Research Centre between UCL and Birkbeck, University of London and which also provides bioinformatics training and support services to biomedical researchers. In 2013, he is a member of editorial boards for PLoS ONE, BioData Mining, Advanced Bioinformatics, Chemical Biology & Drug Design, and Protein: Structure, Function and Bioinformatics.

== Education ==
Jones was educated at Imperial College London where he was awarded a Bachelor of Science degree in Physics. He moved to King's College London to complete a Master of Science degree in Biochemistry followed by University College London where he was awarded a PhD in 1993 for research supervised by William R. Taylor and Janet Thornton.

== Research and career ==
Jones's main research interests are in protein structure prediction and analysis protein folding, transmembrane protein analysis, machine learning applications in bioinformatics, and genome analysis including the application of intelligent software agents. He has consulted for a few different companies, including GlaxoSmithKline, but his main industry experience was as a co-founder of Inpharmatica Limited, which was founded in 1998 as a corporate spin-off from University College London. The company used a combination of bioinformatics and chemoinformatics to look at the relationships between the structure and function of proteins, and the binding of chemical groups to these proteins leading to the discovery of novel drugs.

=== THREADER ===
THREADER provides a method is popularly known as protein fold recognition (threading), a method of protein modeling, which is used to model those proteins which have the same fold as proteins of known structures. The input is an amino acid sequence with unknown protein structure, then THREADER will output a most probable protein structure for this sequence. The degree of compatibility between the sequence and the proposed structure is evaluated by means of set of empirical potentials derived from proteins of known structures.
This work got preceded by David Baker and his colleagues, who have taken THREADER idea further in the form of the Rosetta method which has a huge impact in the field.

=== MEMSAT ===
MEMSAT is an approach to predict the positions of transmembrane helix segments based on the recognition of the topological models of proteins. The method uses a set of statistical tables derived from well-characterized membrane protein data, and we have a dynamic programming algorithm to recognize the membrane topology models by maximizing the expectation. Since MEMSAT was originally built back in 1994, it then triggered a lot of improvements in the prediction of secondary structure. The newest version is MEMSAT3, released in 2007. It uses a neural network to determine the locations of residues are on the cytoplasmic side of the membrane or in the transmembrane helices.

=== CATH database ===
Jones was involved in the early stage of development of the CATH database, with Christine Orengo and Janet Thornton which is a hierarchical domain classification of protein structures in the Protein Data Bank, where the 4 major levels in hierarchy are: Class, Architecture, Topology, and Homologous superfamily. The CATH database employs a combination of automatic and manual techniques.

=== GenTHREADER ===
GenTHREADER is a faster and more powerful tool for protein fold recognition, that can be applied to either whole/individual protein sequences. The method uses a traditional sequence alignment algorithm to generate alignments, and then the alignment will be evaluated by threading techniques. As the last step, each model will be evaluated by a neural network to produce a measurement of the confidence level in the proposed prediction. The emergence of GenTHREADER has enabled a series of improvement work. So far, there are several improved methods available now: mGenTHREADER, pDomTHREADER, and pGenTHREADER.

=== PSIPRED ===
This is a server that aggregates several structure prediction methods. It includes the newly implemented method also known as PSIPRED (Predict Secondary Protein Structure), a technique for protein secondary structure prediction, and the other techniques Predict Transmembrane Topology (MEMSAT3), and Fold Recognition (GenTHREADER). Users submit a protein sequence, perform any prediction of interest, and receive the results by e-mail.

=== Academic service ===
Since 1996, Jones has been involved in many research committees, including: Biotechnology and Biological Sciences Research Council (BBSRC), Engineering and Physical Sciences Research Council (EPSRC), Medical Research Council (MRC), and Research Councils UK. His research has been funded by the BBSRC, The Wellcome Trust, Elsevier, the EPSRC, the MRC, The Royal Society, The European Commission, AstraZeneca, GlaxoSmithKline and Sun Microsystems.

== Awards and honours ==
Jones held a prestigious Royal Society University Research Fellowship from 1995 to 1999. In 2022, Jones was elected as a Fellow of the International Society for Computational Biology and Fellow of the Royal Society in 2023.
