= Fran Lewitter =

Computational biologist

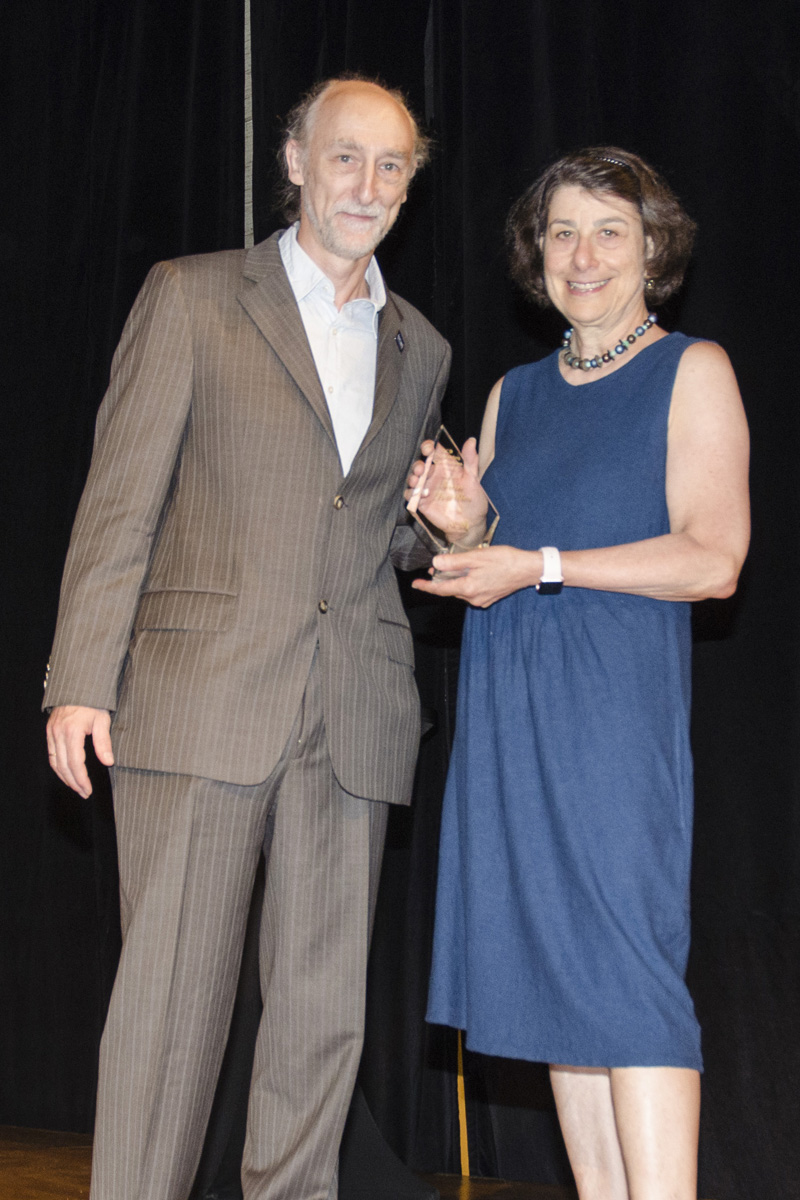
- Fran Lewitter (right), pictured with Alfonso Valencia in 2017.
- Education: University of Colorado Boulder; Harvard Medical School
- Known for: GenBank
- Awards: ISCB Fellow
- Scientific career
- Workplaces: Brandeis University; Whitehead Institute
- Thesis: Genetic models of reading disability (1979)

Frances I. Lewitter is a computational biologist and the founding director of the Whitehead Institute’s Bioinformatics and Research Computing (BaRC) program.

== Education and career ==
Lewitter gained her PhD in human genetics and statistical genetics from the University of Colorado Boulder in 1979. Following a postdoctoral position at Harvard Medical School where she worked on the GenBank project, she joined the Whitehead Institute to run what is considered to be one of the first bioinformatics core facilities. For the first 20 years that Lewitter spent working for the Whitehead institute, her main responsibility was to work with and train basic biomedical researchers who were using sequencing and bioinformatics to develop an improved understanding and work towards the answers for a variety of biological questions. She was deemed the Founding Director of Bioinformatics and Research Computing as a result of her 20 years of research, and was awarded a larger team of staff as the demand for her research grew.

Lewitter is a strong advocate for bioinformatics education, and was education editor of PLOS Computational Biology from 2005 to 2014, and served as an editor for the journal’s “Ten Simple Rules” column from 2014 to 2020

== Awards and honors ==
Lewitter was awarded the 2017 Outstanding Contributions to ISCB Award by the International Society for Computational Biology. In 2022, she was elected a Fellow of the ISCB.
