= Michael Waterman =

American mathematician

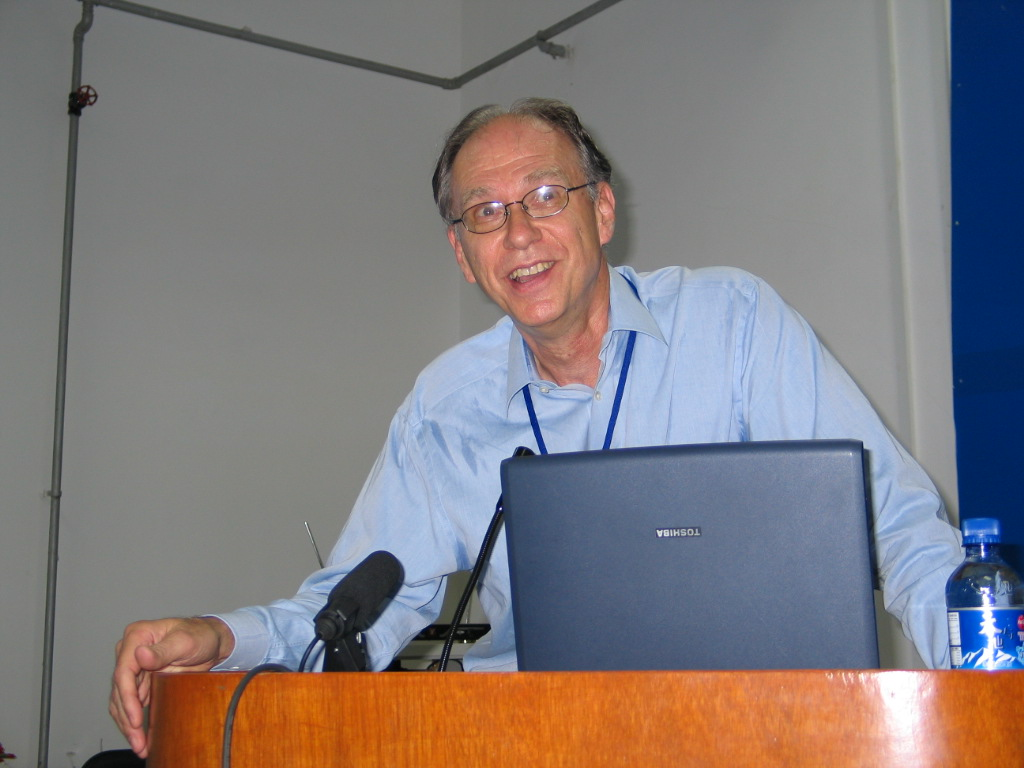
- Michael Waterman in 2004
- Born: Michael Spencer Waterman; June 28, 1942 (age 84); Coquille, Oregon, US
- Education: Oregon State University; Michigan State University (PhD)
- Known for: Smith-Waterman algorithm; Lander-Waterman formula; De Bruijn sequence assembly
- Awards: Guggenheim Fellowship (1995); Gairdner Foundation International Award (2002); ISCB Fellow (2009); Dan David Prize (2015)
- Scientific career
- Fields: Computational biology; Bioinformatics; Probability; Statistics; Computer science; Discrete mathematics; Combinatorics
- Workplaces: University of Southern California; University of Virginia; Los Alamos National Laboratory; Idaho State University
- Thesis: Some Ergodic Properties of Multi-Dimensional F-Expansions (1969)
- Doctoral advisor: John Rankin Kinney
- Notable students: Pavel Pevzner (postdoc); Martin Vingron (postdoc); Tandy Warnow (postdoc); Sophie Schbath (postdoc)
- Website: dornsife.usc.edu/msw/

Michael Spencer Waterman (born June 28, 1942) is a University Professor Emeritus at the University of Southern California (USC), where he held the USC Associates Chair in Natural Sciences and was a professor of biological sciences, computer science, and mathematics. His research has focused on the analysis of DNA, RNA, and protein sequences. He previously held positions at Los Alamos National Laboratory and Idaho State University.

== Education and early life ==
Waterman grew up near Bandon, Oregon, and earned a bachelor's degree in Mathematics from Oregon State University, followed by a PhD in statistics and probability from Michigan State University in 1969.

== Research and career ==
Waterman is one of the founders and current leaders in the area of computational biology. He focuses on applying mathematics, statistics, and computer science techniques to various problems in molecular biology. His work has contributed to some of the most widely used tools in the field. In particular, the Smith-Waterman algorithm (developed with Temple F. Smith) is the basis for many sequence alignment programs. In 1988, Waterman and Eric Lander published a landmark paper describing a mathematical model for fingerprint mapping. This work formed one of the theoretical cornerstones for many of the later DNA mapping and sequencing projects, especially the Human Genome Project. A 1995 paper by Idury and Waterman introduced Eulerian-De Bruijn sequence assembly which is widely used in next-generation sequencing projects.

With Pavel A. Pevzner (a former postdoctoral researcher in his lab), he began the international conference Research in Computational Molecular Biology (RECOMB), and he is a founding editor of the Journal of Computational Biology. Waterman also authored one of the earliest textbooks in the field: Introduction to Computational Biology.

== Awards and honors ==
With Cyrus Chothia and David Haussler, Waterman was awarded the 2015 Dan David Prize for his contributions to the field of bioinformatics. He was awarded an Honorary Doctorate from Tel Aviv University in 2011, an Honorary Doctorate from the University of Southern Denmark in 2013, and an Honorary Doctorate from Oregon State University in 2024.

Waterman has been a member of the US American Academy of Arts and Sciences since 1995, a member of the US National Academy of Engineering since 2012, a member of the Chinese Academy of Sciences since 2013, and a member of the US National Academy of Sciences since 2001. He has been an academician of the French Academy of Sciences since 2005.

Waterman was elected an ISCB Fellow in 2009 by the International Society for Computational Biology and was awarded their ISCB Senior Scientist Award in 2006.

== Personal life ==
Waterman has written a memoir, Getting Outside, of a childhood spent on an isolated livestock ranch on the southern coast of Oregon in the mid-20th century.
