= Christina S. Leslie =

Canadian-American computational biologist

Christina Sunita Leslie is a Canadian-American computational biologist whose research applies machine learning to genomics and the patterns of gene transcription, particularly in the study of cancer. She is particularly known for her research on string kernels for support vector machine classification of biological sequences. She works at the Memorial Sloan Kettering Cancer Center as a scientist in the Computational & Systems Biology Program, and holds an additional affiliation as a professor in the Graduate School of Medical Sciences at Cornell University.

== Education and career ==
Leslie was an undergraduate at the University of Waterloo in Canada, originally intending to study applied mathematics and engineering, but finishing her degree there in pure mathematics. She completed her Ph.D. in mathematics at the University of California, Berkeley, continuing her focus in pure mathematics with a dissertation in differential geometry and Lie theory, Geometric Construction of Intertwining Maps for Mixed Models of Compact Dual Pairs (1998), supervised by Joseph A. Wolf.

After postdoctoral research in mathematics at Columbia University from 1999 to 2000, she continued at Columbia as a lecturer in the Computer Science Department. It was during this time that her research interests shifted from mathematics to computational biology. She moved to the Memorial Sloan Kettering Cancer Center in 2007.

== Recognition ==
Leslie was named as a Fellow of the International Society for Computational Biology in 2021, "recognized as bringing rigorous statistical machine learning techniques to computational biology, including basic science and clinical settings, as well as major contributions to conferences and consortia".

== Selected publications ==
- Leslie, Christina S.; Eskin, Eleazar; Noble, William Stafford (2002), "The spectrum kernel: a string kernel for SVM protein classification" (PDF), in Altman, Russ B.; Dunker, A. Keith; Hunter, Lawrence; Klein, Teri E. (eds.), Proceedings of the 7th Pacific Symposium on Biocomputing, PSB 2002, Lihue, Hawaii, USA, January 3–7, 2002, pp. 566–575
- Leslie, Christina S.; Kuang, Rui (2004), "Fast string kernels using inexact matching for protein sequences" (PDF), Journal of Machine Learning Research, 5: 1435–1455
- Leslie, Christina S.; Eskin, Eleazar; Cohen, Adiel; Weston, Jason; Noble, William Stafford (2004), "Mismatch string kernels for discriminative protein classification", Bioinformatics, 20 (4): 467–476, doi:10.1093/BIOINFORMATICS/BTG431
