= Zhiping Weng =

- Education: University of Science and Technology of China (BSc); Boston University (PhD)
- Awards: ISCB Fellow (2020)
- Scientific career
- Fields: Bioinformatics; Computational biology; Genomics; Epigenomics; Transcriptional regulation
- Workplaces: University of Massachusetts Chan Medical School
- Thesis: Protein-ligand binding: Effective free energy calculations (1997)
- Doctoral advisor: Charles DeLisi
- Website: www.umassmed.edu/zlab/

Zhiping Weng is the Li Weibo Professor of Biomedical Research and founding Chair of Department of Genomics and Computational Biology at the University of Massachusetts Chan Medical School. Prior to that, she was the Director of the Program in Integrative Biology and Bioinformatics at the University of Massachusetts Chan Medical School. She was awarded Fellowship of the International Society for Computational Biology (ISCB) in 2020 for outstanding contributions to computational biology and bioinformatics.

== Education ==
Weng was educated at the University of Science and Technology of China and Boston University where her PhD on the biochemistry of protein-ligand binding was supervised by Charles DeLisi and awarded in 1997.

== Career and research ==
Weng's research interests are in bioinformatics, computational biology, genomics, epigenomics and transcriptional regulation. She is known for her ZDOCK suite of protein-protein docking algorithms, leadership of ENCODE, PsychENCODE, and work on small RNA biology and piwi-interacting RNA (piRNAs).

=== Awards and honors ===
Weng is a Fellow of the International Society for Computational Biology (ISCB) in 2020 and the American Institute for Medical and Biological Engineering (AIMBE) in 2013.
