= Bernard Moret =

Swiss-American computer scientist

Bernard M. E. Moret (born 1953) is a Swiss-American computer scientist, an emeritus professor of computer science at the École Polytechnique Fédérale de Lausanne in Switzerland. He is known for his work in computational phylogenetics, and in particular for mathematics and methods for computing phylogenetic trees using genome rearrangement events.

== Biography ==
Moret was born in 1953 in Vevey Switzerland, and did his undergraduate studies at the École Polytechnique Fédérale de Lausanne (EPFL), graduating in 1975. He went on to graduate studies at the University of Tennessee, earning a Ph.D. in 1980. He then joined the faculty of the University of New Mexico, where he remained until 2006, when he moved to EPFL. He retired from EPFL in December 2016.

In 1996, Moret founded the ACM Journal of Experimental Algorithmics, and he remained editor in chief of the journal until 2003. In 2001, Moret founded the Workshop in Algorithms for Bioinformatics (WABI) and remains on the Steering Committee for the conference.

In 2018, Moret was elected as a Fellow of the International Society for Computational Biology, for his outstanding contributions to the fields of computational biology and bioinformatics.

== Publications ==
Moret is the author of The Theory of Computation (Addison-Wesley, 1998). With H. D. Shapiro, he is the co-author of Algorithms from P to NP, Volume I: Design and Efficiency (Benjamin Cummings, 1991).

He has also written many highly cited research papers in bioinformatics, including papers on calculating the minimum genetic rearrangement distance between a pair of related genomes and on evolutionary tree reconstruction.
