= Li Wei (politician, born 1970) =

Chinese politician (born 1970)

- 李伟

Head of the United Front Work Department of the Jiangxi Provincial Committee of the Chinese Communist Party
- In office September 2025 – May 2026
- Preceded by: Huang Xizhong
- Succeeded by: Vacant

Secretary General of the Jilin Provincial Committee of the Chinese Communist Party
- In office June 2022 – September 2025
- Preceded by: Hu Jiafu
- Succeeded by: Wang Zilian

Vice Governor of Jilin
- In office July 2020 – June 2022

Personal details
- Born: September 1970 (age 56) Nanzhao County, Henan, China
- Party: Chinese Communist Party (1991-)
- Education: Beijing Wuzi University; Nankai University

Li Wei (Chinese: 李伟; born September 1970) is a former Chinese politician, who served as the head of the United Front Work Department of the Jiangxi Provincial Committee of the Chinese Communist Party from 2025 to 2026, the secretary general of the Jilin Provincial Committee of the Chinese Communist Party from 2022 to 2025, and the vice governor of Jilin from 2020 to 2022. He is a delegate to the 20th National Congress of the Chinese Communist Party.

== Career ==
Li Wei was born in Nanzhao County, Henan in September 1970. He was enrolled to Beijing Wuzi University management engineering major in 1989, and graduated in July 1993. After graduating, he was enrolled to China Ordins Corporation (中国兵工物资总公司), a subsidiary of Norinco Group, which served as an officer of market development department. In 1994, he was transferred to China North Optoelectronic Industry Corporation. In 1999, he was served as the deputy director of comprehensive allocation section of human resources department of Norinco Group.

In 2003, Li was transferred to the State-owned Assets Supervision and Administration Commission of the State Council, which served as the deputy director of the first enterprise leadership management bureau. In 2012, he was appointed as the deputy director of office of the SASAC. In 2014, he was appointed as the secretary of the Youth League Committee of Central Enterprises, and the director of research bureau in 2015. In 2019, Li was appointed as the director of the first enterprise leadership management bureau of the SASAC.

In July 2020, Li was appointed as the vice governor of Jilin, and promoted to a sub-provincial official. In June 2022, Li was appointed as the standing member and the secretary general of the Jilin Provincial Committee of the Chinese Communist Party.

In September 2025, Li was appointed as the standing member and the head of the United Front Work Department of the Jiangxi Provincial Committee of the Chinese Communist Party.

== Investigation ==
On 27 May 2026, Li was suspected of "serious violations of laws and regulations" by the Central Commission for Discipline Inspection (CCDI), the party's internal disciplinary body, and the National Supervisory Commission, the highest anti-corruption agency of China.

Party political offices
Preceded by Hu Jiafu	Secretary General of the Jilin Provincial Committee of the Chinese Communist Party; 2022－2025	Succeeded by Wang Zilian
Preceded by Huang Xizhong	Head of the United Front Work Department of the Jiangxi Provincial Committee of the Chinese Communist Party; 2025－2026	Vacant
