= Rita Casadio =

Professor of Biochemistry

- Education: University of Bologna (PhD)
- Awards: ISCB Fellow (2020)
- Scientific career
- Fields: Machine learning SNP annotation Bioinformatics; Computational biology Genome annoation
- Workplaces: University of Bologna
- Website: www.biocomp.unibo.it/casadio/

Rita Casadio is an Adjunct Professor of Biochemistry/Biophysics in the Department of Pharmacy and Biotechnology at the University of Bologna.

== Career ==
She earned her degree in physics at the University of Bologna, Italy. In 1987, she began her academic career as an assistant professor of biophysics at the University of Bologna, later becoming a full professor of biochemistry/biophysics in 2001. Her research primarily focuses on membrane and protein biophysics, as well as computer modeling of biological processes, including protein folding, stability and interactions.

She has authored more than 500 scientific papers and held key roles in various editorial and organizational positions within the field of bioinformatics.

Her work in machine learning has been used for protein structure prediction and methods from her group have been highly ranked in international competitions, such as the Critical Assessment of protein Structure Prediction (CASP) and the Critical Assessment of Function Annotation (CAFA).

== Awards and honours ==
She was elected a Fellow of the International Society for Computational Biology (ISCB) in 2020 for outstanding contributions to the fields of computational biology and bioinformatics.

== See also ==
- ELIXIR
