= Tadashi Kanehisa =

Japanese folklorist and linguist

- Born: 1906; Shodon, Setouchi-chō, Kagoshima Prefecture, Japan
- Died: 1997 (aged 90–91); Kagoshima, Kagoshima Prefecture, Japan
- Citizenship: Japan
- Education: Kyushu Imperial University
- Known for: Folkloristic study of the Amami Islands of southwestern Japan
- Scientific career
- Fields: Folkloristics, Linguistics

Tadashi Kanehisa (金久 正, Kanehisa Tadashi; 1906–1997) was a Japanese folklorist and linguist who worked on the language and culture of his home island Kakeroma, and by extension, Amami Ōshima of southwestern Japan. As an informant of the Shodon dialect, he also worked with linguists Yukio Uemura, Shirō Hattori and Samuel E. Martin.

== Biography ==
Kanehisa was born to a wealthy family in Shodon, a village in southwestern Kakeroma Island of the Amami Islands. Unlike his half-brothers and sisters, he was grown up by his grandparents. His grandfather Minesato (嶺佐登) was an important source of his folkloristic studies in his later life.

He studied English literature at Kyushu Imperial University. Being disappointed with it, he spent about five years pursuing folkloristic studies in his hometown Shodon. He then worked for the Nagasaki Prefectural Government while teaching linguistics at Kwassui Women's College. He published his folkloristic work at the Nantō (Southern Islands) edited by Eikichi Kazari, and the Tabi to Densetsu (Travels and Legends). He won fame for his paper Amori Onagu (天降り女人) (1943), where he proposed a couple of novel theories on Amami's swan maiden motif, a conundrum originally posed by Shomu Nobori. His work was highly commended by Kunio Yanagita, the father of Japanese folkloristics. His main source of information was a group of young men from Amami who had been drafted into the armament industry in Nagasaki. His informants were all killed by the U.S. atomic bombing on Nagasaki in 1945. He himself gradually lost his eyesight after the bombing.

After World War II, he returned to Shodon and soon moved to Naze (part of modern-day Amami City), the center of Amami Ōshima. His blindness kept him from using his talent for prestigious jobs. He ran a private-tutoring school for the English language during daytime while continuing folkloristic and linguistic research at night. His decades of work resulted in the book titled Amami ni ikiru Nihon kodai bunka (Ancient Japanese Culture Still Alive in Amami). Its publication was done with the help from linguist Shirō Hattori.

Being a linguist himself, he worked as an informant for the Shodon dialect of Southern Amami Ōshima of the Ryukyuan languages. He worked with Yukio Uemura, Shirō Hattori and Samuel Martin. He was praised as an ideal informant by Hattori. His primarily linguistic work include the Amami hōgen on'in no sandai tokushoku (Three features of the Amami dialect phonology) and the Amami ni ikiru kotengo (Literary language still alive in Amami). He spent his final years in Kagoshima. He died in 1997, leaving an uncompleted dictionary of the Amami dialect.

== Links ==
- Minoru Kanehisa, his nephew, a bioinformatician
