= Cathy H. Wu =

American computer scientist

- Born: 1957 (age 68–69); Taiwan
- Education: National Taiwan University (BS); Purdue University (MS, PhD); University of Texas at Tyler (MS)
- Scientific career
- Fields: Computational biology
- Institutions: University of Delaware; Georgetown University Medical Center
- Thesis: Alterations in Transcription and Translation in Compatible Maize-Helminthosporium Maydis Interaction (1984)
- Doctoral advisor: H.L. Warren

Cathy Huey-Hwa Wu (born 1957) is a Taiwanese pathologist, molecular biologist, and computational biologist. She is the Edward G. Jefferson Chair of Bioinformatics & Computational Biology at the University of Delaware, where she is also a professor of computer and information sciences, and director of its Center for Bioinformatics & Computational Biology (CBCB).

Wu is also the director of the Protein Information Resource (PIR) and the North east Bioinformatics Collaborative Steering Committee, and an adjunct professor at the Georgetown University Medical Center.

== Early life and education ==
Wu is the middle child of the five daughters and a son in her family. Her father was an aeronautics engineer.

Wu graduated from National Taiwan University in 1978 with a Bachelor of Science (B.S.) in plant pathology. She then completed advanced studies in the United States at Purdue University, where she earned a Master of Science (M.S.) in 1982 in plant pathology and a Ph.D. in molecular biology and plant pathology in 1984. Her doctoral dissertation, titled "Alterations in Transcription and Translation in Compatible Maize-Helminthosporium Maydis Interaction," was supervised by H.L. Warren. In 1986, Wu was a postdoctoral researcher in molecular biology at Michigan State University and earned a second M.S. in computer science from the University of Texas at Tyler in 1989.

== Career ==
In 1989, Wu completed her thesis on the use of artificial neural networks to classify proteins, and graduated. Her thesis advisor, George M. Whitson III, chairman of the Computer Science Department at UT hired her after she graduated in 1989. She then taught computer science as an assistant professor at the Department of Computer Science in UT Tyler from 1989 to 1994. She also worked as an assistant professor from 1990 to 1994, associate professor from 1994 to 1998, and professor from 1998 to 1999 of the Biomathematics University of Texas Health Center at Tyler. She carried out research at the UT Tyler's health sciences college under epidemiology and biomathematics professor Jerry McClarty. She has conducted bioinformatics research from 1990 and developed several protein classification systems and databases. She also managed large software and database projects leading bioinformatics effort of the Protein Information Resource (PIR) from 1999, and became the PIR Director and the vice president of the National Biomedical Research Foundation, Washington, D.C. from 2001 to 2002. From 2001 until present, she is the professor of the Department of Biochemistry & Molecular Biology and the Director of PIR Georgetown University Medical Center (GUMC). She is also currently the professor at the Department of Oncology and the member of the Lombardi Comprehensive Cancer Center, GUMC from 2002. In 2009, Wu was accepted as the Edward G. Jefferson Chair of Bioinformatics and Computational Biology at the University of Delaware (UD).

== Awards and honors ==
In 2020, Wu was elected an ACM Fellow.

== Books and publications ==
=== Books ===
- Bioinformatics for Comparative Proteomics (Methods in Molecular Biology), November 19, 2010, by Cathy H. Wu (Editor), Chuming Chen (Editor), ISBN 978-1607619765
- Computational Biology and Genome Informatics, February 2003, by Cathy H. Wu (Author), Paul P. Wang (Author), Jason T. L. Wang (Editor), ISBN 978-9812382573
- Neural Networks and Genome Informatics, Volume 1 (Methods in Computational Biology and Biochemistry), October 5, 2000, by C.H. Wu (Editor), J.W. McLarty (Editor), ISBN 978-0080428000

=== Publications ===
- UniProt: a hub for protein information. UniProt Consortium. Nucleic Acids Res. Jan 28;43 (Database issue) (2015)
- Suzek, BE; Wang, Y; Huang, H; McGarvey, PB; Wu, CH (2014). "UniRef clusters: a comprehensive and scalable alternative for improving sequence similarity searches". Bioinformatics. 31 (6): 926–32. doi:10.1093/bioinformatics/btu739. PMC 4375400. PMID 25398609.
- Natale, DA; Arighi, CN; Blake, JA; Bult, CJ; Christie, KR; Cowart, J; D'Eustachio, P; Diehl, AD; Drabkin, HJ; Helfer, O; Huang, H; Masci, AM; Ren, J; Roberts, NV; Ross, K; Ruttenberg, A; Shamovsky, V; Smith, B; Yerramalla, MS; Zhang, J; AlJanahi, A; Çelen, I; Gan, C; Lv, M; Schuster-Lezell, E; Wu, CH (2014). "Protein Ontology: a controlled structured network of protein entities". Nucleic Acids Res. 42 (Database issue): D415–21. doi:10.1093/nar/gkt1173. PMC 3964965. PMID 24270789.
- Uniprot, Consortium (2014). "Activities at the Universal Protein Resource (UniProt)". Nucleic Acids Res. 42 (Database issue): D191–8. doi:10.1093/nar/gkt1140. PMC 3965022. PMID 24253303.
