= Charles DeLisi =

American geneticist (born 1941)

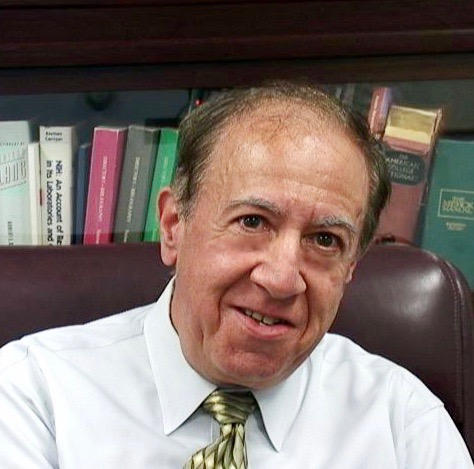
- DeLisi in 2006
- Born: December 9, 1941 (age 83); Bronx, New York, U.S.
- Education: City College of New York (BA); New York University (PhD)
- Known for: Initiating the Human Genome Project; Receptor mediated signal transduction; Academic administration
- Spouse: Lynn DeLisi (m. 1968; div. 2006)
- Partner: Noreen Vasady-Kovacs (2011 - )
- Awards: US DOE Exceptional Service Award; Smithsonian Platinum Technology Award for Pioneering Leadership; Presidential Citizens Medal
- Scientific career
- Fields: Biomedicine
- Institutions: Boston University; Los Alamos National Laboratory; National Cancer Institute; Yale University
- Thesis: Thermally Induced Transitions in Collagen (1970)
- Doctoral advisor: Morris Shamos
- Doctoral students: Zhiping Weng; Itai Yanai
- Website: www.bu.edu/eng/profile/charles-delisi-ph-d/

Charles Peter DeLisi (born December 9, 1941) is an American biomedical scientist and the Metcalf Professor of Science and Engineering at Boston University. He is noted for major contributions to the initiation of the Human Genome Project, for transformative academic leadership, and for research contributions to mathematical and computational immunology, cell biophysics, genomics and protein and nucleic acid structure and function. Recent activities include mathematical finance and climate change.

== Early life and education ==
DeLisi was born in the Bronx, graduated from City College of New York (CCNY) with a Bachelor of Arts degree in history (1963), and received his Ph.D. in physics (1965 -1969) from New York University (NYU).

== Career and research ==
In 1969, he joined Donald Crothers’ laboratory as a National Institutes of Health (NIH) postdoctoral research fellow in the department of chemistry at Yale University. In 1972, he was appointed a theoretical division staff scientist at Los Alamos National Laboratory, where he collaborated with George Bell, a theoretical physicist who a few years earlier had begun pioneering research in mathematical immunology. DeLisi was subsequently appointed senior scientist (1975–1982) at the National Cancer Institute, NIH, and founding head of the Section on Theoretical Immunology (1982–1985), where he and his collaborators established one of the earliest protein and DNA sequence databases fully integrated with machine learning programs for functional inference and developed a number of analytical methods that proved useful in cell biology.

In 1986, as director of the U.S. Department of Energy's (DOE) Health and Environmental Research Programs, DeLisi and his advisors proposed the Human Genome Project to the White House Office of Management and Budget and the Congress. The proposal created much controversy but received strong endorsement from Alvin Trivelpiece, who was chief of DOE's Office of Science, and William Flynn Martin, the Deputy Secretary of Energy. It was included in President Ronald Reagan's fiscal year 1987 budget submission to the Congress and was approved subsequently by both the House of Representatives and the Senate, the latter with the essential endorsement of Senator Pete Domenici (R, NM). During the spring of 1987, shortly before leaving the DOE, DeLisi established an ethical studies component of the Project. The goal was to reserve 3-5% of the funding for scholars of the humanities and social sciences to develop a system of ethics that would inform decisions about the development and deployment of the radically new technologies destined to emerge from the completion of the Project.

In addition to the medical and scientific advances engendered by the Human Genome Project, it and its progeny have had a profound effect on research of cell biology. Computer scientists, in particular, transformed the topic and created a record of discovery destined to provide much material for studying the sociology of late 20th and early 21st century science. Computational and mathematical methods are now considered as important to progress in cell biology, a change that is forcing even the most conservative universities to develop new methods of biological education. The Human Genome Project enabled a rapid transformation of DOE's health, environmental and energy programs, increasing considerably the importance of the Office of Health and Environmental Research.

Commemorating the significance of the Human Genome Project, the DOE installed a bronze plaque outside room F-202 at its Germantown, Maryland facility. The plaque is imprinted:

From this room the Human Genome Project evolved from a mere concept to a revolutionary research program through the vision and determination of Dr. Charles DeLisi, Associate Director of Energy Research for Health and Environmental Research, 1985 to 1987.

In 1987, DeLisi returned to New York as a professor and department chairperson at the Mount Sinai School of Medicine.

=== Boston University years ===
In 1990 DeLisi joined Boston University (BU) as dean of the College of Engineering. Under his watch the College grew into a leading research institution, adding among other things Centers for Biotechnology, Photonics and Manufacturing Engineering. In addition, the Biomedical Engineering (BME) department added a new dimension to the field, namely molecular and cellular engineering, and was the home of the seminal research in synthetic biology.

In 1999 DeLisi initiated the nation's first Ph.D. program in bioinformatics and served as chairperson for more than a decade.

In 2000, after 10 years as dean, DeLisi resumed a full-time faculty position as dean emeritus and Metcalf Professor. The lobby of the building that houses the College of Engineering Dean's Office is named in his honor, as is an annual College of Engineering award lecture.

DeLisi is a Fellow of the American Association for the Advancement of Science (AAAS) and of the American Institute for Medical and Biological Engineering (AIMBE). In 1999 he was awarded the CCNY Townsend Harris Medal, in 2011 he was elected an honorary citizen of Marineo, Palermo, Italy, and in 2019 he was recipient of the Informa Clinical and research excellence lifetime achievement award.
