= Shoshana Wodak =

Computational biologist

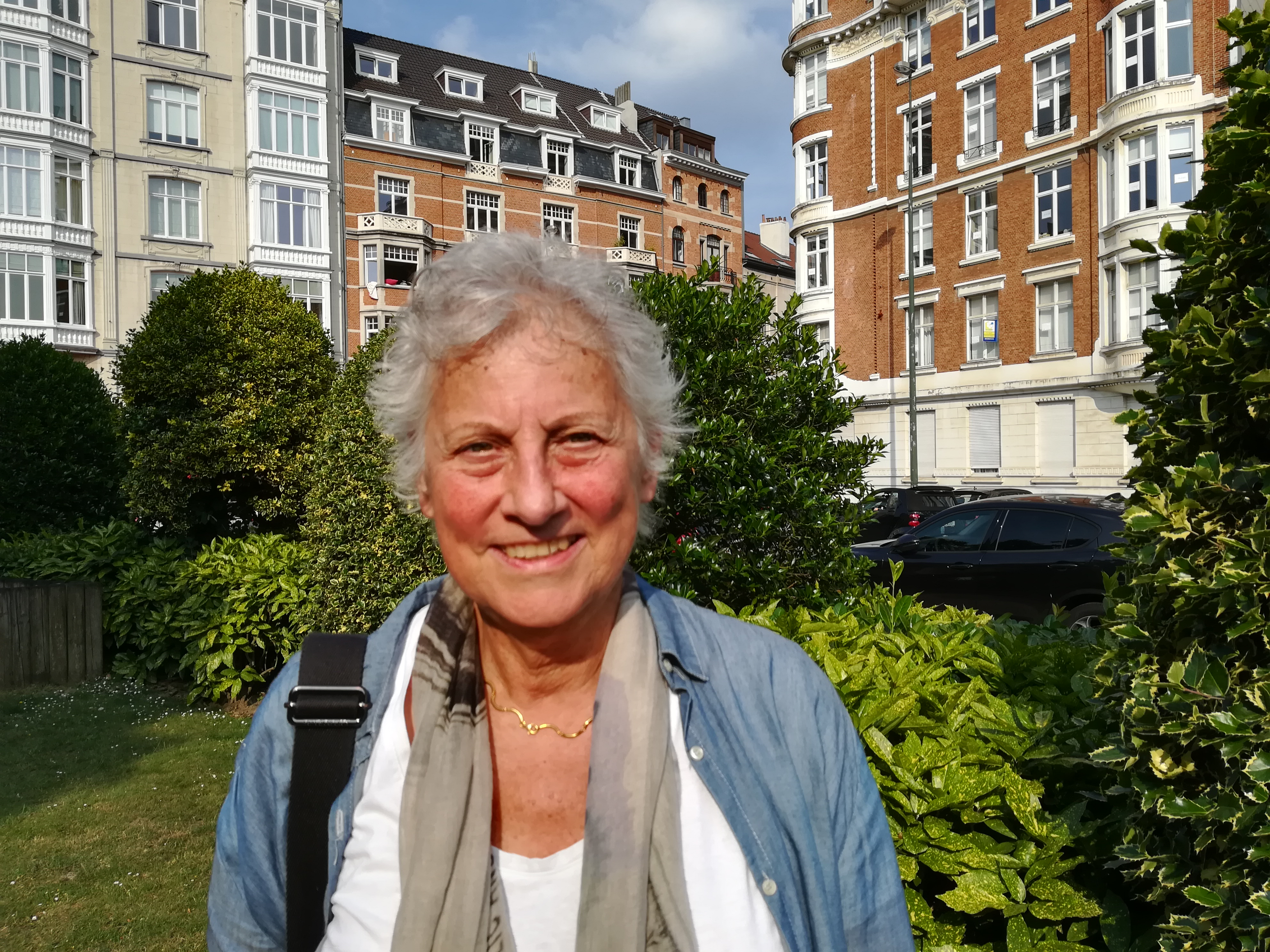
- Shoshana Wodak in Brussels in 2018
- Education: Free University of Brussels; Columbia University
- Awards: ISCB Fellow (2016)
- Scientific career
- Fields: Computational biology
- Institutions: University of Toronto
- Website: wodaklab.org

Shoshana Wodak is an Austrian computational biologist and an organizational leader in the field of protein-protein docking. Wodak was one of the first people to dock proteins together using a computer program.

Wodak received her Licence in chemistry from the Free University of Brussels, followed by a Ph.D in biophysics from Columbia University in 1974. Since 1981, she has held teaching and research positions at the Université Libre de Bruxelles, and in 1990 she became associate professor in the Faculty of sciences. Between 1995-2002 she also held the position of Group Leader at the European Bioinformatics Institute (EBI).

Wodak was elected an ISCB Fellow by the International Society for Computational Biology in 2016 and is one of the ISCB founders. She helped organize the Critical Assessment of Prediction of Interactions, for which she has served on the Management Group since the founding in 2002.

Wodak worked in the Research Institute of the SickKids Hospital in Toronto, Canada, where she became in 2004 the Scientific Director of the Centre for Computational Biology.

== Publications ==
Wodak SJ, Pu S, Vlasblom J, Séraphin B. (2008), "Challenges and rewards of interaction proteomics", Mol Cell Proteomics. September 17, pp. 1535–9484.

Malevanets A, Sirota FL, Wodak SJ. (2008), "Mechanism and energy landscape of domain swapping in the B1 domain of protein G., J Mol Biol. September 26, 382(1), pp. 223–35.

Pu S, Ronen K, Vlasblom J, Greenblatt J, Wodak SJ. (2008), "Local coherence in genetic interaction patterns reveals prevalent functional versatility", Bioinformatics. August 20, pp. 1460–2059.

Roca M, De Maria L, Wodak SJ, Moliner V, Tunon I, Giraldo J. (2008), "Coupling of the guanoisne glycosidic bond confirmation and the ribonucleotidecleavage reaction: implications for barnase catalysis", Proteins. February 1, 1097-0134.

Sirota FL, Héry-Huynh S, Maurer-Stroh S, Wodak SJ.(2008), "Role of the amino acid sequence in domain swapping of the B1 domain of protein G", Proteins, January 10, 1097-0134.

Dessailly BH, Lensink MF, Orengo CA, Wodak SJ. (2008), "LigASite--a database of biologically relevant binding sites in proteins with known apo-structures", Nucleic Acids Res. Jan 36, Database issue:D667-73.

Pu S, Vlasblom J, Emili A, Greenblatt J, Wodak SJ. (2007), "Identifying functional modules in the physical interactome of Saccharomyces cerevisiae," Proteomics 7, pp. 944–60.

Lensink MF, Mendez R, Wodak SJ. (2007), "Docking and scoring protein complexes," CAPRI 3rd Edition Proteins 69, pp. 704–18.

Croes D, Couche F, Wodak SJ, van Helden J. (2006) "Inferring meaningful pathways in weighted metabolic networks," J Mol Biol., February 10, 356(1), pp. 222–36.

Krogan NJ, Cagney G, Yu H, Zhong G, Guo X, Ignatchenko A, Li J, Pu S, Datta N, Tikuisis AP, Punna T, Peregrin-Alvarez JM, Shales M, Zhang X, Davey M, Robinson MD, Paccanaro A, Bray JE, Sheung A, Beattie B, Richards DP, Canadien V, Lalev A, Mena F, Wong P, Starostine A, Canete MM, Vlasblom J, Wu S, Orsi C, Collins SR, Chandran S, Haw R, Rilstone JJ, Gandi K, Thompson NJ, Musso G, St Onge P, Ghanny S, Lam MH, Butland G, Altaf-Ul AM, Kanaya S, Shilatifard A, O'Shea E, Weissman JS, Ingles CJ, Hughes TR, Parkinson J, Gerstein M, Wodak SJ, Emili A, Greenblatt JF. (2006), "Global landscape of protein complexes in the yeast Saccharomyces cerevisiae," Nature, March 30, 440 (7084), pp. 637–43.

Billingsley G, Santhiya ST, Paterson AD, Ogata K, Wodak S, Hosseini SM, Manisastry SM, Vijayalakshmi P, Gopinath PM, Graw J, Heon E. (2006), "CRYBA4, a novel human cataract gene, is also involved in microphthalmia," Am J Hum Genet., October, 79(4), pp. 702-9.

Vlasblom J, Wu S, Pu S, Superina M, Liu G, Orsi C, Wodak SJ. (2006), "GenePro: a cytoscape plug-in for advanced visualization and analysis of interaction networks", Bioinformatics, September 1;22(17), pp. 2178-9.

Simonis N, Gonze D, Orsi C, van Helden J, Wodak SJ. (2006), "Modularity of the transcriptional response of protein complexes in yeast", J Mol Biol., October 20;363(2), pp. 589-610.

Croes D, Couche F, Wodak SJ, van Helden J. (2005), "Metabolic PathFinding: inferring relevant pathways in biochemical networks," Nucleic Acids Res., July 1;33 (Web Server issue):W326-30.

Jaramillo A, Wodak SJ. (2005), "Protein design is a challenge for implicit solvation models," Biophysical J., January 88(1), pp. 156-71.
