= Satoru Miyano =

Japanese bioinformatician (born 1954)

- Born: December 5, 1954 (age 71)
- Education: Kyushu University
- Awards: ISCB Fellow (2013)
- Scientific career
- Workplaces: University of Tokyo; Northwestern University; Tokyo Medical and Dental University
- Website: bonsai.hgc.jp/people/miyano/profile.html

Satoru Miyano (宮野 悟, Miyano Satoru; born December 5, 1954) is a professor and the director of the M&D Data Science Center at Tokyo Medical and Dental University. He was awarded fellowship of the International Society for Computational Biology (ISCB) in 2013 for outstanding contributions to the fields of computational biology and bioinformatics.

== Career ==
In 1977 Miyano graduated from the Department of Mathematics, Faculty of Science, Kyushu University. He also got his master's degree in 1979 and became an assistant professor at Kyushu University. In 1985 he also received his PhD with hierarchy theorems in automata theory. In 1987 Miyano became an associate professor at the Faculty of Science, Kyushu University. In 1993 he became a professor at the aforementioned university.

In 1996 he became a professor at the Human Genome Center at the University of Tokyo. From 2000 to 2005, excluding a year from March 2003, Miyano was the vice director of the Institute of Medical Science, University of Tokyo.

In July 2013 he became the first Japanese person to be elected an ISCB fellow.

Starting June 2015, he served as the president of the Kanagawa Cancer Center, and was the first president without a doctor's license. He worked to advance cancer immunotherapy and strengthen genetic research but resigned in February 2018 due to the confusion related to the retirement of radiation oncologists at the center.

In April 2020, Miyano became the director of the M&D Data Science Center, Tokyo Medical and Dental University, and a specially appointed professor at the same university.

== Awards ==
In 1994 Miyano received Japan IBM Science Award. He also received the Sakai Special Commemorative Award in 1994.

In 2016 Miyano received the Uehara Prize.
