= Pavel A. Pevzner =

Russian-born American professor of computational mass spectrometry

Pavel Pevzner
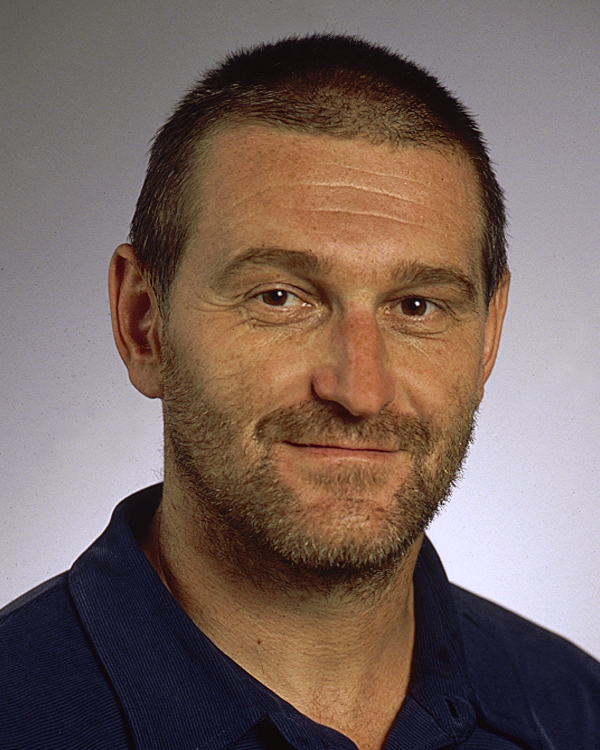
- Pavel Pevzner in 2011
- Born: Pavel Arkadevich Pevzner
- Education: Moscow Institute of Physics and Technology
- Awards: ACM Fellow; ISCB Fellow; ISCB Senior Scientist Award; HHMI Professor; AAAS Fellow
- Scientific career
- Fields: Bioinformatics; Algorithms; Computational biology
- Workplaces: University of Southern California; Pennsylvania State University; University of California, San Diego
- Thesis: (1988)
- Academic advisors: Michael Waterman
- Doctoral students: Vineet Bafna
- Website: cseweb.ucsd.edu/~ppevzner

Pavel Arkadevich Pevzner (Russian: Павел Аркадьевич Певзнер) is the Ronald R. Taylor Professor of Computer Science and director of the NIH Center for Computational Mass Spectrometry at University of California, San Diego. He serves on the editorial board of PLoS Computational Biology and he is a member of the Genome Institute of Singapore scientific advisory board.

== Education ==
Pevzner received his Ph.D. in mathematics and physics from the Moscow Institute of Physics and Technology while working for the Russian Research Institute for Genetics and Selection of Industrial Microorganisms (NII Genetika). In 1990, he joined Michael Waterman's laboratory in the Department of Mathematics at the University of Southern California for two years as a postdoctoral research associate.

== Career and research ==
Pevzner is interested in new approaches to teaching computational molecular biology at both undergraduate and graduate level, serving as a founding instructor for the bioinformatics specialization on Coursera and having written several books on bioinformatics and computational biology.

In 1992, Pevzner took the position of associate professor at Pennsylvania State University.

In 1995, Pevzner moved back to the University of Southern California as a professor of mathematics, computer science, and molecular biology. Since 2000, he has been the Ronald R. Taylor Professor of Computer Science at the University of California, San Diego and he is the director of the NIH Center for Computational Mass Spectrometry.

=== Books ===
- Computational Molecular Biology, MIT Press, 2000
- An Introduction to Bioinformatics Algorithms, MIT Press, 2004 (co-authored with Neil Jones)
- Bioinformatics for Biologists, Cambridge University Press, 2011 (co-edited with Ron Shamir)
- Bioinformatics Algorithms: An Active Learning Approach, Active Learning Publishers, 2014 (co-authored with Phillip Compeau)

=== Awards and honors ===
- NSF Young Investigator Award (1994, 1995)
- HHMI Professor award (2006) from the Howard Hughes Medical Institute
- UCSD Chancellor Associates Award for Excellence in Research (2007)
- ACM Fellow (2010), for contribution to algorithms for genome rearrangements, DNA sequencing, and proteomics
- Honoris causa degree (2011) from Simon Fraser University
- ISCB Fellow (2012)
- ISCB Senior Scientist Award (2017)
- ACM Paris Kanellakis Theory and Practice Award (2018)
