= Beijing Wuzi University =

Municipal public college in Tongzhou, Beijing, China

Coordinates: 39.9290°N 116.6388°E

- 北京物资学院
- Type: Public college
- Established: 1980; 46 years ago
- President: Wang Jiaqiong
- Location: Tongzhou District, Beijing, China
- Campus: Urban
- Website: bwu.edu.cn

Beijing Wuzi University (Chinese: 北京物资学院; lit. 'Beijing Materials College') is a municipal public college in Tongzhou District, Beijing, China. It is affiliated with the Beijing Municipal People's Government and managed by the Beijing Municipal Education Committee.

== History ==
The predecessor of Beijing Wuzi University was the Department of Materials Management at Beijing Economics College (北京经济学院物资管理系), established in 1963 under the national materials administration. In 1980, the department was established as Beijing Wuzi College (北京物资学院). In 1988, following the restructuring of the State Council and the establishment of the Ministry of Materials, the university came under the administration of the Ministry of Materials. In 1992, the Ministry of Materials was dissolved and replaced by the Ministry of Internal Trade, and the university was placed under the new ministry.

In 1998, with the adjustment of the national higher education management system, the university was transferred to the administration of the Beijing Municipal People's Government. In February 2018, Beijing Business and Technology School (北京市商务科技学校) was merged into Beijing Wuzi College.

== Administration ==
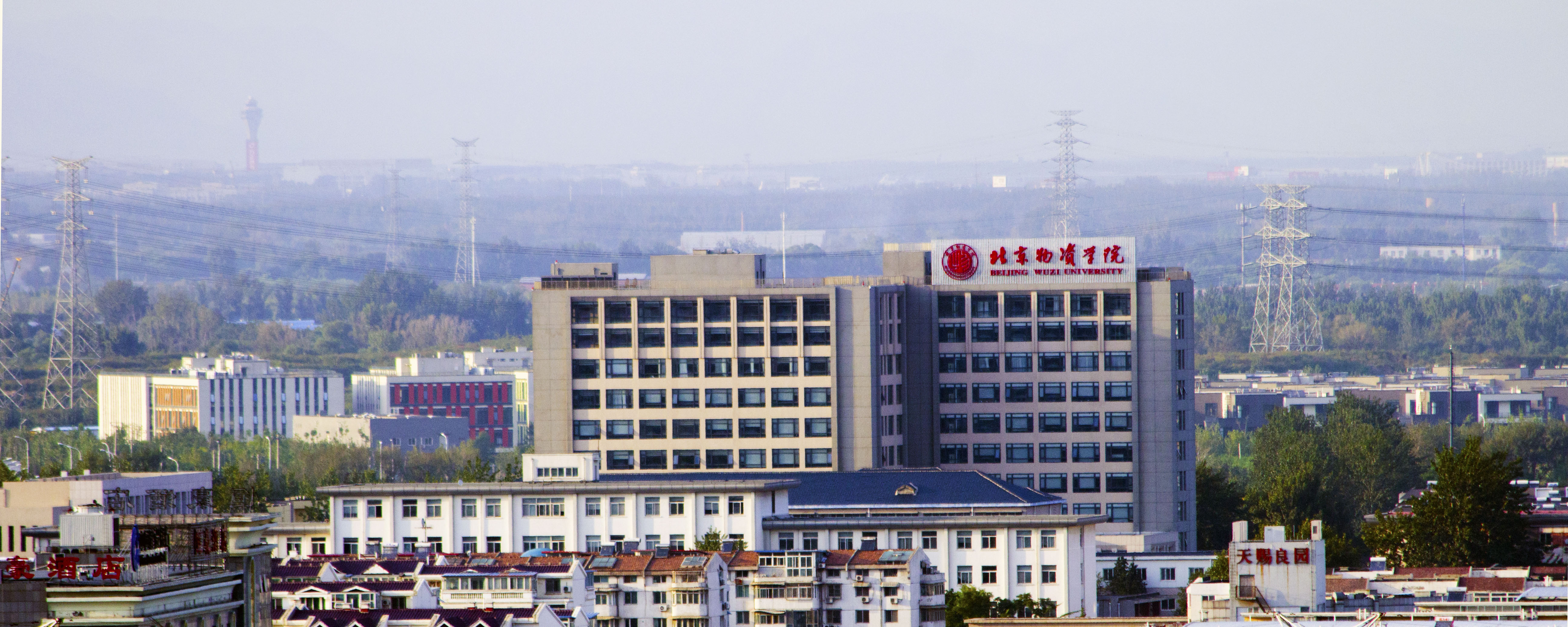

=== Colleges and Departments ===
Beijing Wuzi University comprises the following departments:

- Department of Economics
- Department of Accounting
- Department of Business Management
- Department of Management Science and Engineering
- Department of Labor Personnel Management
- Department of Foreign Languages
- Department of Social Science
- Department of Basic Course
- Department of Physical Education
- Department of Postgraduate
- Circulation Economics Graduate School
- Higher-learning Education Graduate School
- Logistics Research Center
- China Circulation Economy Magazine Organization.
