= Jack Weinstein =

Jack Weinstein may refer to:

- Jack B. Weinstein (1921–2021), American judge
- Jack Weston (born Morris Weinstein; 1924–1996), American actor
- Jack Weinstein (Medal of Honor) (1928–2006), U.S. Army soldier and Medal of Honor recipient
- Jack Weinstein (general), U.S. Air Force general
- Jack Russell Weinstein (born 1969), American philosopher

== See also ==
- Jay Weston (born John Martin Weinstein, 1929–2023), American film producer and restaurant critic
