= Christine Orengo =

Professor of Bioinformatics

Christine Orengo FRS
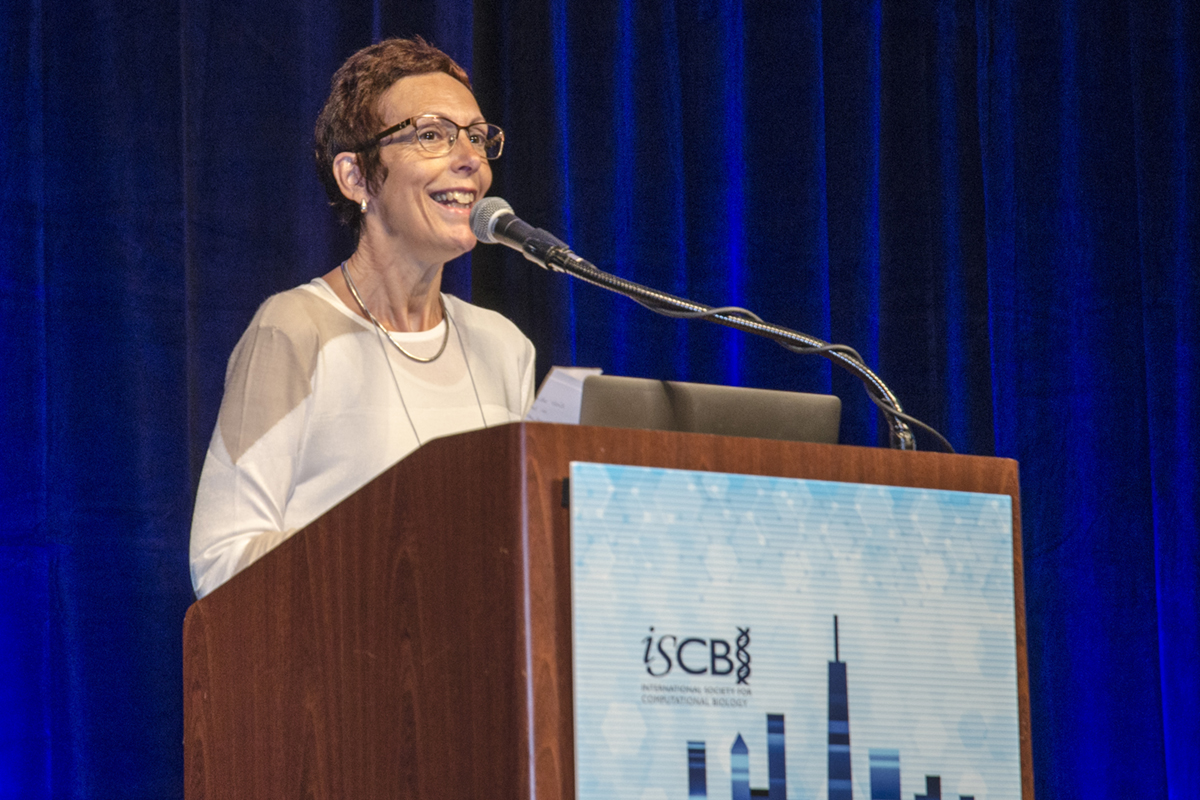
- Christine Orengo in speaking at the Intelligent Systems for Molecular Biology (ISMB) conference in Chicago in 2018
- Born: Christine Anne Orengo; 22 June 1955 (age 71)
- Education: University of Bristol (BSc); University of Aberdeen (MSc); University College London (PhD)
- Known for: CATH database
- Awards: EMBO Membership (2014)
- Scientific career
- Fields: Protein structure; Protein structure comparison; Protein structure prediction; Protein function prediction; Bioinformatics
- Workplaces: National Institute for Medical Research (NIMR); University College London (UCL)
- Thesis: A study of the redox properties of haem in proteins and model systems (1984)
- Doctoral students: Camilla Pang
- Website: www.ucl.ac.uk/orengo-group

Christine Anne Orengo FRS is a Professor of Bioinformatics at University College London (UCL) known for her work on protein structure, particularly the CATH database. From 2021 to 2024, Orengo served as president of the International Society for Computational Biology (ISCB), the first woman to do so in the history of the society.

== Education ==
Orengo studied Chemical Physics at the University of Bristol where she was awarded a Bachelor of Science degree in 1976. She continued her studies at the University of Aberdeen where she was awarded a Master of Science degree in Medical Physics in 1977 for research on the disruption of iron metabolism in laboratory rats with Yoshida sarcomas. She was awarded a PhD for research on the redox properties of haem in proteins in 1984 from UCL.

== Career and research ==
Following her PhD, Orengo worked in industry as Chief Chemist for FCI International, Brussels and mathematical modeller for Humphreys & Glasgow in London. In 1987 she was appointed a postdoctoral researcher at the National Institute for Medical Research (NIMR) in Mill Hill where she worked until 1990. She joined the department of biochemistry and molecular biology at UCL and in 1995 and was awarded a Medical Research Council (MRC) senior fellowship in Bioinformatics. She was promoted to Professor of Bioinformatics in 2002.

Orengo's research analyses genes, proteins and biological systems using computational methods to classify proteins into evolutionary families. Her research has been funded by the Medical Research Council and the Biotechnology and Biological Sciences Research Council (BBSRC).

Orengo is co-editor with David Jones and Janet Thornton of the textbook Bioinformatics: Genes, Proteins and Computers. As of 2021, according to Google Scholar and Scopus her most cited work has been published in Nature, Nucleic Acids Research, Structure and the Journal of Molecular Biology. Her former doctoral students include Camilla Pang, Sonja Lehtinen and Ian Sillitoe.

=== Awards and honours ===
Orengo was elected a member of the European Molecular Biology Organization (EMBO) in 2014 and a Fellow of the Royal Society (FRS) in 2019.
