= Minoru Kanehisa =

Japanese bioinformatician (born 1948)

- Born: January 23, 1948 (age 78); Kagoshima, Japan
- Education: University of Tokyo
- Known for: KEGG
- Awards: ISCB Fellow (2013)
- Scientific career
- Fields: Bioinformatics; Computational biology
- Workplaces: Kyoto University; University of Tokyo
- Thesis: (1976)
- Website: www.kanehisa.jp/en/kanehisa.html

Minoru Kanehisa (金久 實) (born January 23, 1948) is a Japanese bioinformatician. He is a project professor at Kyoto University, technical director of Pathway Solutions Inc and president of NPO Bioinformatics Japan. He is one of Japan's most recognized and respected bioinformatics experts and is known for developing the KEGG bioinformatics database.

In 2018 he was listed on a list of Clarivate Citation Laureates for the Nobel Prize in Physiology or Medicine for "contributions to bioinformatics, specifically for his development of the Kyoto Encyclopedia of Genes and Genomes (KEGG)".

== Career ==
Kanehisa studied at the University of Tokyo, gaining his Doctor of Science degree in physics in 1976. Following postdoctoral studies at Johns Hopkins School of Medicine and Los Alamos National Laboratory, he became a staff scientist at Los Alamos in 1981. While at Los Alamos, he was one of the developers of the GenBank database of all publicly available nucleotide sequences and their protein translations. Kanehisa joined Kyoto University as an associate professor in 1985, becoming a professor in 1987.

In 1995, Kanehisa started the KEGG (Kyoto Encyclopedia of Genes and Genomes) database project. Foreseeing the need for a computerized resource that can be used for biological interpretation of genome sequence data, he started developing the KEGG PATHWAY database. It is a collection of manually drawn KEGG pathway maps representing experimental knowledge on metabolism and various other functions of the cell and the organism. Each pathway map contains a network of molecular interactions and reactions and is designed to link genes in the genome to gene products (mostly proteins) in the pathway. This has enabled the analysis called KEGG pathway mapping, whereby the gene content in the genome is compared with the KEGG PATHWAY database to examine which pathways and associated functions are likely to be encoded in the genome.

== Awards and honors ==
In 1999, Kanehisa was elected the first president of the Japanese Society for Bioinformatics. He was elected as a Fellow of the International Society for Computational Biology in 2013.

== Links ==
- Tadashi Kanehisa, his uncle, a folklorist and linguist
