= Janet Thornton =

British bioinformatician and academic (born 1949)

Dame Janet Thornton DBE FRS FMedSci FRSC
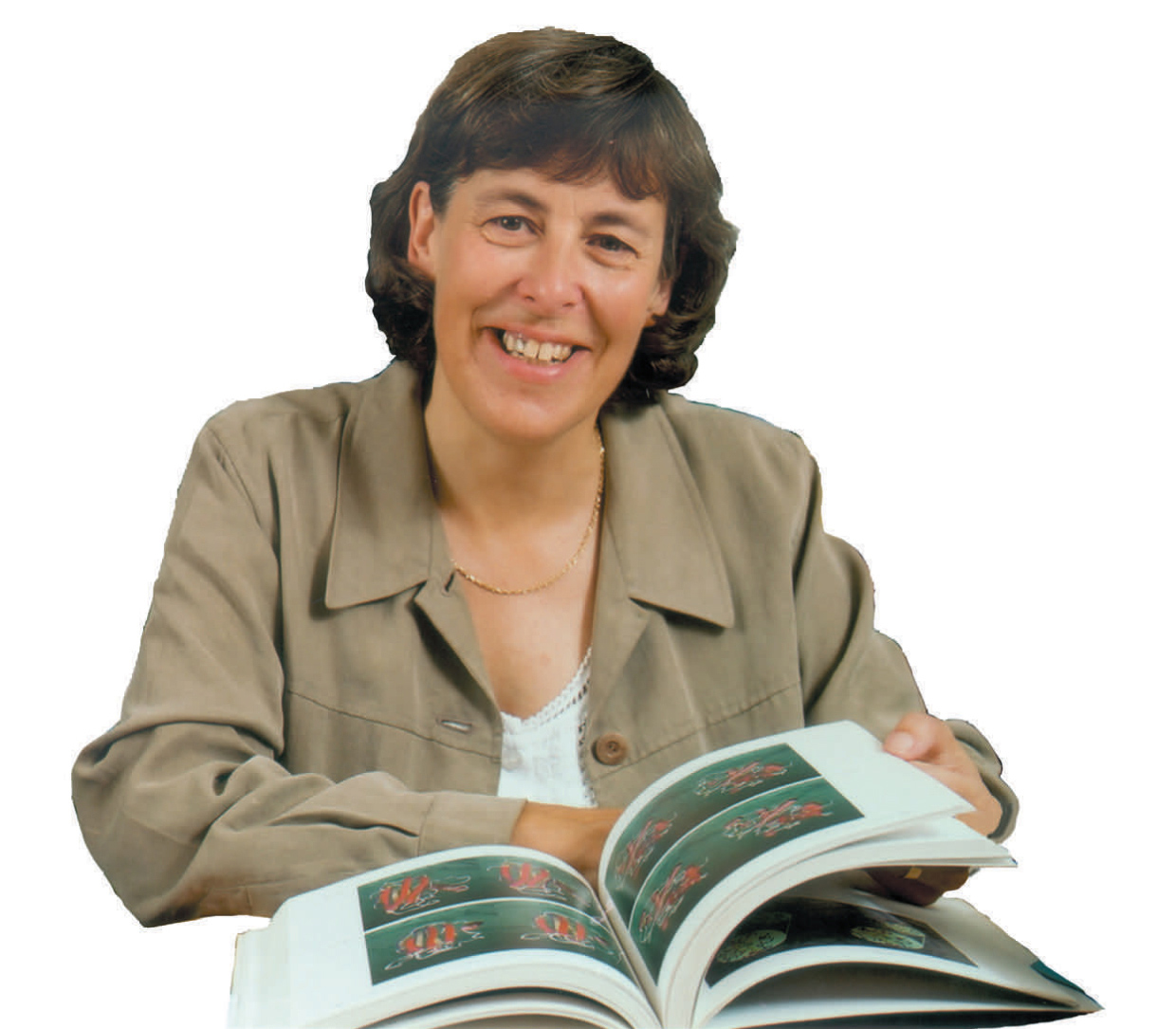
- Janet Thornton
- Born: Janet Maureen McLoughlin; 23 May 1949 (age 77)
- Education: Bury Grammar School
- Alma mater: University of Nottingham (BSc); King's College London (PhD)
- Known for: EBI; CATH; ELIXIR
- Spouse: Alan D. Thornton (m. 1970)
- Children: 2
- Awards: EMBO Member (2000); Member of the National Academy of Sciences (2003); ISCB Senior Scientist Award (2005); Suffrage Science award (2011)
- Scientific career
- Fields: Computational biology; Protein structural biology; Bioinformatics; Ageing
- Workplaces: European Bioinformatics Institute; National Institute for Medical Research; University of Oxford; University College London
- Thesis: The conformation of dinucleotides (1975)
- Notable students: David Jones; Sarah Teichmann (postdoc)
- Website: www.ebi.ac.uk/research/thornton

Dame Janet Maureen Thornton (born 23 May 1949) is a British senior scientist and director emeritus at the European Bioinformatics Institute (EBI), part of the European Molecular Biology Laboratory (EMBL). She is one of the world's leading researchers in structural bioinformatics, using computational methods to understand protein structure and function. She served as director of the EBI from October 2001 to June 2015, and played a key role in ELIXIR.

== Education ==
Thornton attended Bury Grammar School until 1967, where she was head girl. After graduating in physics from the University of Nottingham, Thornton completed a master's degree in biophysics at King's College London, and a PhD in biophysics at the National Institute for Medical Research, Mill Hill, London in 1973.

== Career and research ==
After her PhD, Thornton worked in molecular biophysics with David Chilton Phillips at the University of Oxford. In 1978, she returned to the National Institute for Medical Research, and following that took up to a Fellowship at Birkbeck College, part of the University of London. In 1990 she was appointed Professor and Director of the Biomolecular Structure and Modeling Unit in the Department of Biochemistry and Molecular Biology at University College London and later also was appointed to the Bernal Chair in the Crystallography Department at Birkbeck College.

Thornton was Director of the European Bioinformatics Institute (EBI) from 2001 to 2015, on the Wellcome Genome Campus at Hinxton near Cambridge. She was an organiser of the Intelligent Systems for Molecular Biology (ISMB) and European Conference on Computational Biology (ECCB) joint Conference in Glasgow in 2004.

Thornton's work is highly interdisciplinary, interfacing with structural biology, bioinformatics, biological chemistry and chemoinformatics, amongst others. She was an early pioneer in structure validation for protein crystallography, developing the widely used ProCheck software. Together with Christine Orengo, she introduced the CATH classification of protein structure. Her group developed a robust enzyme classification, comparison and annotation tool – the EC-BLAST which calculates similarity between enzymes based on chemical reactions by capturing the bond change(s), reaction centre(s) or structural similarity between them.

From 2008 to 2012, she co-ordinated the four-year preparatory phase of the European life sciences data infrastructure ELIXIR. As of 2013 she remains on the ELIXIR board as one of EMBL's scientific delegates. Her research has been funded by the Medical Research Council, the Biotechnology and Biological Sciences Research Council (BBSRC), the Wellcome Trust, and the European Union.

=== Doctoral students and postdocs ===
Thornton has supervised several PhD and postdoctoral researchers including Sarah Teichmann and David Jones.

=== Awards and honours ===
Thornton was elected Fellow of the Royal Society (FRS) in 1999. She became a member of the European Molecular Biology Organisation (EMBO) in 2000, a foreign associate of the US National Academy of Sciences in 2003, and a Fellow of the Academy of Medical Sciences (FMedSci) in 2014. Thornton is a supernumerary fellow of Churchill College, Cambridge. She was elected a Fellow of the Royal Society of Chemistry (FRSC) in 2017. Thornton's nomination for the Royal Society reads

Janet Thornton is distinguished for her contribution to understanding protein three-dimensional structure: her perceptive comparative studies have led to the development of algorithms that are used to analyse and make predictions of supersecondary and tertiary structure. In the 1970s at Oxford (with M J Sternberg) she established clear and useful rules for the handedness of B-a-B units and demonstrated valid methods for prediction of the ordering of strands in B-sheets. At Birkbeck she developed this work to define families of conformations in B-hairpins and aB-links where the structures had previously been assumed at random. She has made the most comprehensive and useful analyses of tertiary interactions of protein sidechains, leading to an atlas that is valuable for protein and ligand design. The atlas is used widely in both academia and the pharmaceutical industry. At University College she has developed studies of sidechain conformation and stereochemistry into a procedure, PROCHECK, for evaluating the quality of experimentally defined protein structures: this is used widely to check protein structures. She has presented a method, known as threading, which gives strong evidence about tertiary structure for a protein sequence which is not obviously homologous to any other known structure.

Her citation on election to the Academy of Medical Sciences reads:

Dame Janet Thornton is Director of the European Bioinformatics Institute and is a world leader in bioinformatics. She has contributed significantly to medical science by increasing our fundamental understanding of the structure of proteins and how they contribute to disease and ageing. The tools and databases she has developed are used worldwide for basic research, in academia and also in pharmaceutical companies. As Director of the EBI, she has been responsible for strategic developments related to the impact of the life sciences data on medical science. She is actively pursuing the challenge of how to join up biological and medical data in the UK and building tools which will facilitate the exploitation of these data for research and in the clinic.

Thornton was appointed Commander of the Order of the British Empire (CBE) in 2000 and Dame Commander of the Order of the British Empire (DBE) in the 2012 Birthday Honours for services to bioinformatics. The Times named Thornton number 86 of their "Eureka 100" British scientists in 2010. She was awarded the Suffrage Science award in 2011.

In 2026 Thornton was awarded the Royal Society Croonian Medal and Lecture for 'pioneering work in protein structural and functional bioinformatics.'

Academic offices
Preceded by Michael Ashburner; Graham Cameron	Director of the European Bioinformatics Institute; 2001–2015	Succeeded by Rolf Apweiler; Ewan Birney
