= Martin Vingron =

Austrian mathematician

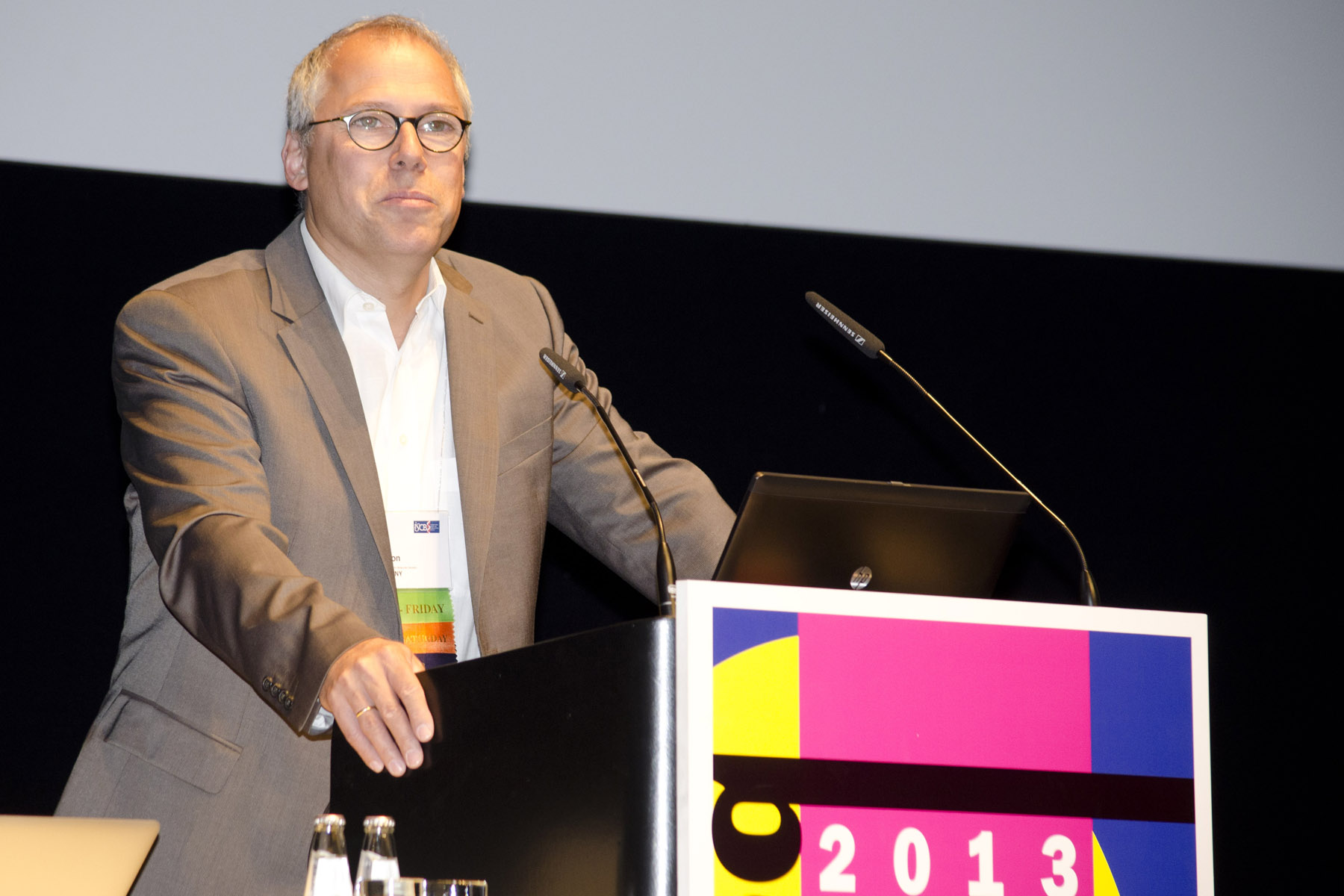
- Martin Vingron in 2013.
- Born: October 5, 1961 (age 64); Vienna, Austria
- Education: Heidelberg University; European Molecular Biology Laboratory
- Awards: Max Planck Research Prize (2004)
- Scientific career
- Fields: Bioinformatics; Computational biology
- Thesis: Multiple Sequence Alignment and Applications in Molecular Biology (1991)
- Doctoral advisors: Willi Jäger; Patrick Argos
- Website: owww.molgen.mpg.de/~vingron/

Martin Vingron (born October 5 1961) is an Austrian mathematician working in the fields of bioinformatics and computational biology. Since 2000, he has been Director of the Max Planck Institute for Molecular Genetics.

== Education ==
Vingron grew up in Vienna, and gained his Diploma in Mathematics from the University of Vienna in 1985. He later studied at Heidelberg University and the European Molecular Biology Laboratory, gaining his Dr. rer. nat. (equivalent to a PhD) in Applied Mathematics in 1991. His thesis studied the applications of multiple sequence alignment in molecular biology.

== Work and research ==
From 1995-2000, Vingron was Director of the Division of Theoretical Bioinformatics at the German Cancer Research Center. Since 2000, he has been Director of the Max Planck Institute for Molecular Genetics. Since 2006, he has been a part-time Director at the CAS-MPG Partner Institute for Computational Biology in Shanghai, China.

Vingron's early work focused on multiple sequence alignment, protein sequences, sequence comparison and molecular evolution. His focus later shifted to the processing and mathematical analysis of DNA microarrays. More recently, his research has explored methods for utilizing gene expression data in the discovery of gene regulatory mechanisms.

Vingron has also been a member of the Research in Computational Molecular Biology (RECOMB) conference steering committee.

== Awards ==
In 2001, Vingron became an Honorary Professor at the Free University of Berlin. In 2004, together with Gene Myers, Vingron was awarded the Max Planck Research Prize for international cooperation in bioinformatics. He was also elected as a Fellow of the German Academy of Sciences Leopoldina in 2004. In 2012, Vingron was elected as a Fellow of the International Society for Computational Biology.
