= Eleazar Eskin =

American computer scientist and geneticist

- Education: UCLA Henry Samueli School of Engineering and Applied Science; Columbia University
- Scientific career
- Fields: Computer science genetics
- Doctoral advisor: Salvatore Stolfo
- Website: https://web.cs.ucla.edu/~eeskin/

Eleazar Eskin is a computer scientist and geneticist known for his work in computational biology and human genomics. He is a professor and the Chair of the Department of Computational Medicine, and professor of computer science and human genetics at the University of California, Los Angeles. His research overlaps bioinformatics, genomics, and machine learning, with a focus on developing statistical and computational techniques to probe the genetic basis of human disease. He was elected a Fellow of the International Society for Computational Biology (ISCB) in 2019.

== Education and career ==
Eskin received his Bachelor of Science, Master of Science, and Ph.D. in Computer Science from Columbia University. His doctoral research was supervised by Salvatore Stolfo. After completing his Ph.D., he was a postdoctoral researcher at the University of California, San Diego (UCSD).

He began his faculty career at UCSD before moving to the University of California, Los Angeles (UCLA) in 2007. At UCLA, he holds joint appointments as a professor in the Department of Computer Science and the Department of Human Genetics. In 2016, he was named the founding chair of UCLA's newly established Department of Computational Medicine, an interdisciplinary department that integrates expertise from computer science, bioinformatics, and medicine.

== Awards and honours ==
He was elected a Fellow of the International Society for Computational Biology (ISCB) in 2019 for "outstanding contributions to the fields of computational biology and bioinformatics". He is also a recipient of Alfred P. Sloan Foundation Research Fellowship.

== Selected research ==
- Kang, Hyun Min, et al. "Variance component model to account for sample structure in genome-wide association studies." Nature genetics 42.4 (2010): 348.
- Kang, Hyun Min, et al. "Efficient control of population structure in model organism association mapping." Genetics 178.3 (2008): 1709–1723.
- Tompa, Martin, et al. "Assessing computational tools for the discovery of transcription factor binding sites." Nature biotechnology 23.1 (2005): 137.
- Leslie, Christina, Eleazar Eskin, and William Stafford Noble. "The spectrum kernel: A string kernel for SVM protein classification." Biocomputing 2002. 2001. 564–575.
