= ISCB Fellow =

ISCB Fellowship
- Awarded for: "outstanding contributions to the fields of computational biology and bioinformatics"
- Date: 2009
- Location: Intelligent Systems for Molecular Biology
- Presented by: International Society for Computational Biology
- No. of Fellows: 161, as of 2025
- Website: www.iscb.org/cms_addon/fellow/iscb-fellows-program.php

ISCB Fellowship is an award granted to scientists that the International Society for Computational Biology (ISCB) judges to have made "outstanding contributions to the fields of computational biology and bioinformatics". As of 2025, there are 161 Fellows of the ISCB including Michael Ashburner, Alex Bateman, Bonnie Berger, Helen M. Berman, Steven E. Brenner, Janet Kelso, Daphne Koller, Michael Levitt, Sarah Teichmann, Janet Thornton, and Shoshana Wodak. See List of Fellows of the International Society for Computational Biology for a comprehensive listing.

== Fellows of the International Society for Computational Biology ==
The first seven fellows of the ISCB were laureates of the ISCB Senior Scientist Award from 2003 to 2009:

1. Webb Miller
2. David Haussler
3. Temple F. Smith
4. Michael Waterman
5. Janet Thornton
6. David J. Lipman
7. David Sankoff

Since 2009, new fellows have been nominated from the community of ISCB members and voted on annually by a selection committee. New fellows are traditionally inaugurated at the annual Intelligent Systems for Molecular Biology (ISMB) conference.
