= Terri Attwood =

British bioinformatics researcher

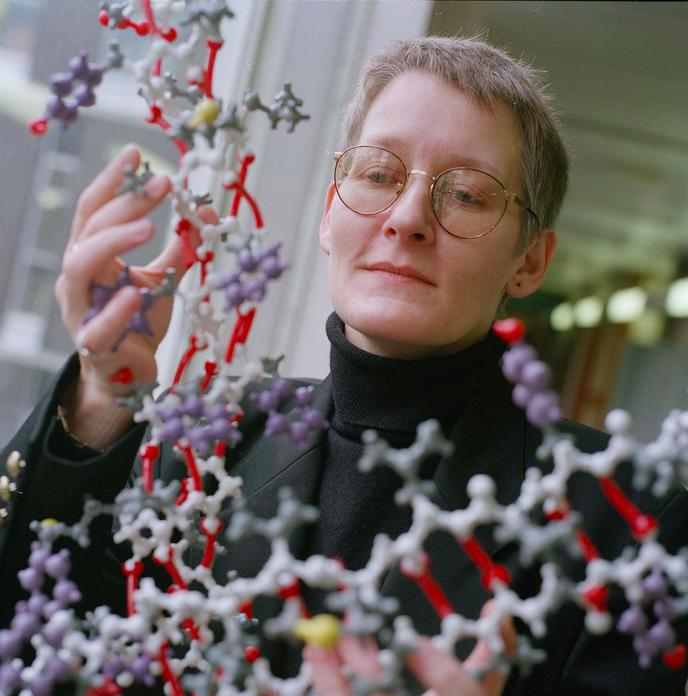
- Born: Teresa K. Attwood; 20 November 1959 (age 66)
- Education: University of Leeds
- Known for: PRINTS database; UTOPIA tools
- Awards: Royal Society University Research Fellowship 1993–2002
- Scientific career
- Fields: Bioinformatics; Protein fingerprinting
- Workplaces: University of Manchester; University College London; University of Leeds; EMBL-EBI
- Thesis: Chromonic mesophases (1984)
- Doctoral advisor: John E. Lydon
- Doctoral students: Manuel Corpas
- Website: www.bioinf.manchester.ac.uk/dbbrowser; manchester.ac.uk/research/fls/Teresa.k.attwood

Teresa K. Attwood (born 20 November 1959) is a professor of Bioinformatics in the Department of Computer Science and School of Biological Sciences at the University of Manchester and a visiting fellow at the European Bioinformatics Institute (EMBL-EBI). She held a Royal Society University Research Fellowship at University College London (UCL) from 1993 to 1999 and at the University of Manchester from 1999 to 2002.

== Education ==
Attwood gained her Bachelor of Science in Biophysics from the University of Leeds in 1982. She was awarded a PhD, also in Biophysics, two years later, in 1984 under the supervision of John E. Lydon studying chromonic mesophases.

== Research and career ==
Attwood undertook postdoctoral research at Leeds until 1993, when she moved to University College London for five years before moving to the University of Manchester in 1999. Her research concerns protein sequence alignment and protein analysis.

Inspired by the creation of PROSITE, Attwood developed a method of protein fingerprinting and used this to establish the PRINTS database. With Amos Bairoch she sought to unify work on protein family classification and annotation, eventually jointly securing a European Union grant with Rolf Apweiler to establish InterPro, with Pfam, ProDom and Swiss-Prot/TrEMBL as consortium partners in 1997.

Attwood has led major projects including the BioMinT FP5 text-mining consortium, the EMBER bioinformatics education consortium (including EBI and Swiss Institute of Bioinformatics as partners), and the EPSRC PARADIGM Platform. She is the Manchester principal investigator on projects SeqAhead (Next-generation sequencing data analysis network) and AllBio (bioinformatics infrastructure for unicellular, animal and plant sciences), and was also Manchester PI on EMBRACE and EuroKUP (kidney and urine proteomics). Attwood was a member of ELIXIR's Bioinformatics Training Strategy Committee (Work Package 11) during ELIXIR's preparatory phase. She is currently Chair of the EMBnet Global Bioinformatics Network, she was a member of the Executive Committees of the International Society for Biocuration, and the Bioinformatics Training Network, and was recently elected to the Board of Directors of the International Society for Computational Biology. In 2012, she spearheaded the establishment of a GOBLET (Global Organisation for Bioinformatics Learning, Education and Training), with the major bioinformatics, computational biology and biocuration societies, networks and organisations as partners. As of 2016, Attwood is the Chair of the GOBLET Executive Board.

As well as being a biocurator she has co-developed tools to align and visualise protein sequences and structures, including Ambrosia and CINEMA. The group are building re-usable software components to create useful bioinformatics applications through UTOPIA (Bioinformatics tools), and are developing new approaches for automatic annotation and text mining, like PRECIS, METIS, BioIE, and semantic approaches to data integration, such as the Semantic Biochemical Journal published by Portland Press. The UTOPIA tools underpin both the Semantic Biochemical Journal and a collaborative project with Pfizer and AstraZeneca to develop a 21st-century interface to biomedical literature and data management.

Attwood's research has received funding from the Engineering and Physical Sciences Research Council, the Biotechnology and Biological Sciences Research Council, the Wellcome Trust, the Royal Society, the European Union and industry.

=== Teaching ===
Attwood teaches on undergraduate and postgraduate courses and has been doctoral advisor or co-supervisor to several PhD students (e.g., Manuel Corpas). Attwood has co-authored several book chapters and three popular bioinformatics textbooks: Introduction to Bioinformatics and Bioinformatics and Molecular Evolution. Attwood is a co-author of the bioinformatics textbook Bioinformatics Challenges at the Interface of Biology and Computer Science: Mind the Gap with Steve Pettifer and Dave Thorne.

=== Academic service ===
Attwood serves on the editorial board of the Biochemical Journal, Database: The Journal of Biological Databases and Curation, Molecular and Cellular Proteomics, the Journal of Molecular Graphics and Modelling and the EMBnet.journal.

=== Awards and honours ===
Attwood held a Royal Society University Research Fellowship (URF) from 1993 to 2002.
