= LL-100 panel =

The LL-100 panel is a group of 100 human leukemia and lymphoma cell line, can be used in model of biomedical research.

== Purpose ==
LL-100 panel cell lines cover the full spectrum of human leukemia and lymphoma including T-cell, B-cell and myeloid malignancies.

== List of LL-100 cell lines ==
=== Pre-B-ALL ===
Cell line	Sex	Age	Ref	Cellosaurus
697	Male	12Y		CVCL_0079
KOPN-8	Female	3M		CVCL_1866
NALM-6	Male	19Y		CVCL_0092
REH	Female	15Y		CVCL_1650
SEM	Female	5Y		CVCL_0095

=== B-NHL: Burkitt/B-ALL ===
Cell line	Sex	Age	Ref	Cellosaurus
BJAB	Female	5Y		CVCL_5711
Daudi cell	Male	16Y		CVCL_0008
Raji	Male	11Y		CVCL_0511
RAMOS	Male	3Y		CVCL_0597
VAL	Female	50Y		CVCL_1819

=== B-NHL: CLL/PLL ===
Cell line	Sex	Age	Ref	Cellosaurus
HG-3	Male	70Y		CVCL_Y547
JVM-3	Male	73Y		CVCL_1320
JVM-13	Male	60-69Y		CVCL_1318
MEC-1	Male	61Y		CVCL_1870
PGA-1	Male	unspecified		CVCL_Y545

=== B-NHL: DLBCL ABC ===
Cell line	Sex	Age	Ref	Cellosaurus
NU-DHL-1	Male	73Y		CVCL_1876
OCI-Ly3	Male	52Y		CVCL_8800
Ri-1	Female	57Y		CVCL_1885
U-2932	Female	29Y		CVCL_1896
U-2946	Male	52Y		CVCL_X503

=== B-NHL: DLBCL GC ===
Cell line	Sex	Age	Ref	Cellosaurus
DoHH2	Male	60Y		CVCL_1179
OCI-Ly7	Male	48Y		CVCL_1881
OCI-Ly19	Female	27Y		CVCL_1878
SU-DHL-4	Male	38Y		CVCL_0539
SU-DHL-6	Male	43Y		CVCL_2206
WSU-DLCL2	Male	41Y		CVCL_1902

=== B-NHL: HCL ===
Cell line	Sex	Age	Ref	Cellosaurus
BONNA-12	Male	46Y		CVCL_1090
Hair-M	Male	86Y		CVCL_B401
HC-1	Male	56Y		CVCL_1243

=== B-NHL: MCL ===
Cell line	Sex	Age	Ref	Cellosaurus
Granta-519	Female	58Y		CVCL_1818
JeKo-1	Female	78Y		CVCL_1865
JVM-2	Female	63Y		CVCL_1319
Mino	Male	68Y		CVCL_1872
REC-1	Male	61Y		CVCL_1884

=== B-NHL: PEL ===
Cell line	Sex	Age	Ref	Cellosaurus
BC-3	Male	85Y		CVCL_1080
BCBL-1	Male	40Y		CVCL_0165
CRO-AP2	Male	49Y		CVCL_1147
CRO-AP5	Male	35Y		CVCL_1148

=== B-NHL: PMBL ===
Cell line	Sex	Age	Ref	Cellosaurus
U-2940	Female	18Y		CVCL_1897

=== Multiple myeloma/PCL ===
Cell line	Sex	Age	Ref	Cellosaurus
KMS-12-BM	Female	64Y		CVCL_1334
L-363	Female	36Y		CVCL_1357
LP-1	Female	56Y		CVCL_0012
OPM-2	Female	56Y		CVCL_1625
RPMI-8226	Male	61Y		CVCL_0014
U-266	Male	53Y		CVCL_0566

=== Hodgkin lymphoma ===
Cell line	Sex	Age	Ref	Cellosaurus
HDLM-2	Male	74Y		CVCL_0009
KM-H2	Male	37Y		CVCL_1330
L-428	Female	37Y		CVCL_1361
L-1236	Male	34Y		CVCL_2096
SUP-HD1	Male	37Y		CVCL_2208

=== T-ALL/T-LL ===
Cell line	Sex	Age	Ref	Cellosaurus
CCRF-CEM	Female	3Y11M		CVCL_0207
DND-41	Male	13Y		CVCL_2022
HPB-ALL	Male	14Y		CVCL_1820
Jurkat	Male	14Y		CVCL_0065
MOLT-4	Male	19Y		CVCL_0013
RPMI-8402	Female	16Y		CVCL_1667

=== Mature T-malignancy ===
Cell line	Sex	Age	Ref	Cellosaurus
DERL-7	Male	30Y		CVCL_2017
HH	Male	61Y		CVCL_1280
MOTN-1	Female	65Y		CVCL_2127

=== NK malignancy ===
Cell line	Sex	Age	Ref	Cellosaurus
KHYG-1	Female	45Y		CVCL_2976
NK-92	Male	50Y		CVCL_2142
YT	Male	15Y		CVCL_1797

=== ALCL ===
Cell line	Sex	Age	Ref	Cellosaurus
DEL	Male	12Y		CVCL_1170
SR-786	Male	11Y		CVCL_1711
SU-DHL-1	Male	10Y		CVCL_0538
SUP-M2	Female	5Y		CVCL_2209

=== AML myelocytic ===
Cell line	Sex	Age	Ref	Cellosaurus
EoL-1	Male	33Y		CVCL_0258
HL-60	Female	36Y		CVCL_0002
Kasumi-1	Male	7Y		CVCL_0589
KG-1	Male	59Y		CVCL_0374
NB4	Female	23Y		CVCL_0005
OCI-AML3	Male	57Y		CVCL_1844
SKNO-1	Male	22Y		CVCL_2196

=== AML monocytic ===
Cell line	Sex	Age	Ref	Cellosaurus
ME-1	Male	40Y		CVCL_2110
MOLM-13	Male	20Y		CVCL_2119
Mono-Mac-6	Male	64Y		CVCL_1426
MUTZ-3	Male	29Y		CVCL_1433
THP-1	Male	1Y		CVCL_0006
U-937	Male	37Y		CVCL_0007

=== AML erythroid ===
Cell line	Sex	Age	Ref	Cellosaurus
F-36P	Male	68Y		CVCL_2037
HEL	Male	30Y		CVCL_0001
OCI-M2	unspecified	56Y		CVCL_2150
TF-1	Male	35Y		CVCL_0559

=== AML megakaryocytic ===
Cell line	Sex	Age	Ref	Cellosaurus
CMK	Male	10M		CVCL_0216
ELF-153	Male	41Y		CVCL_2031
M-07e	Female	6M		CVCL_2106
MEGAL	Female	unspecified		CVCL_1833
MKPL-1	Male	66Y		CVCL_2116
UT-7	Male	64Y		CVCL_2233

=== CML myeloid BC ===
Cell line	Sex	Age	Ref	Cellosaurus
EM-2	Female	5Y		CVCL_1196
K-562	Female	53Y		CVCL_0004
KCL-22	Female	32Y		CVCL_2091
Ku812	Male	38Y		CVCL_0379
LAMA-84	Female	29Y		CVCL_0388
MOLM-20	Female	63Y		CVCL_2121

=== CML lymphoid BC ===
Cell line	Sex	Age	Ref	Cellosaurus
BV-173	Male	45Y		CVCL_0181
CML-T1	Female	36Y		CVCL_1126
NALM-1	Female	3Y		CVCL_0091
TK-6	Male	30Y		CVCL_X907

=== MPN ===
Cell line	Sex	Age	Ref	Cellosaurus
SET-2	Female	71Y		CVCL_2187

== See also ==
- NCI-60, 60 human cancer cell lines used by the NCI
- List of breast cancer cell lines
