= SIGLEC6 =

Protein-coding gene in the species Homo sapiens

Identifiers
- Aliases: SIGLEC6, CD327, CD33L, CD33L1, CD33L2, CDW327, OBBP1, sialic acid binding Ig like lectin 6
- External IDs: OMIM: 604405; GeneCards: SIGLEC6

Gene location (Human)
Chr.	Chromosome 19 (human)
Band	19q13.41	Start	51,517,819 bp
Band	19q13.41	End	51,531,856 bp
RNA expression pattern
Bgee	Human / Mouse (ortholog); Top expressed in: buccal mucosa cell; placenta; tibialis anterior muscle; rectum; pancreatic ductal cell; gallbladder; mucosa of ileum; lymph node; appendix; smooth muscle tissue / n/a; More reference expression data
BioGPS	n/a
Gene ontology
Molecular function	protein binding; carbohydrate binding
Cellular component	integral component of membrane; extracellular region; plasma membrane; integral component of plasma membrane; membrane
Biological process	cell-cell signaling; cell adhesion
Sources:Amigo / QuickGO
Orthologs
Databases	NCBI: entry; OMA: entry
Species	Human	Mouse
Entrez	946	n/a
Ensembl	ENSG00000105492	n/a
UniProt	O43699	n/a
RefSeq (mRNA)	NM_001177547; NM_001177548; NM_001177549; NM_001245; NM_198845 NM_198846	n/a
RefSeq (protein)	NP_001171018; NP_001171019; NP_001171020; NP_001236; NP_942142 NP_942143	n/a
Location (UCSC)	Chr 19: 51.52 – 51.53 Mb	n/a
PubMed search		n/a
- Wikidata
View/Edit Human

Sialic acid-binding Ig-like lectin 6 is a protein that in humans is encoded by the SIGLEC6 gene. The gene was originally named CD33L (CD33-like) due to similarities between these genes but later became known as OB-BP1 (OB [leptin]-binding protein 1) due to its ability to bind to this factor and, finally, SIGLEC6 as the sixth member of the SIGLEC family of receptors to be identified. The protein has also been given the CD designation CD327.

== Expression ==
Siglec-6 was first found to be expressed in placental tissue, which was confirmed when this protein was independently identified in a screen for leptin-binding proteins. Using a newly generated monoclonal antibody against Siglec-6 to detect protein expression, this latter study found that Siglec-6 was expressed by placental cytotrophoblasts and syncytiotrophoblasts as well as several human hematopoietic cell lines, including TF-1, HEL, U937, and THP-1 cells. This monoclonal antibody also bound to nearly all human peripheral blood B cells, although more recent reports have not replicated this finding. Siglec-6 has also been found to be highly expressed on human mast cells, including primary CD34+ progenitor cell-derived mast cells and the LAD2 cell line. Examining the proteome of mast cells from several tissues, it was determined that Siglec-6 is consistently expressed on mast cells from a variety of human tissues, including adipose, skin, lung, and colon, at relatively high levels. Siglec-6 was not detected on any peripheral blood leukocytes. Siglec-6 expression on human mast cells has since been extended to those isolated and cultured from skin and the mast cell lines HMC-1.2, LUVA, ROSA KIT^{WT}, and ROSA KIT^{D816V}, regardless of KIT mutation status, even when cell-surface expression of the related receptor Siglec-8 is lost. In addition, single-cell RNAseq of esophageal biopsies from patients with eosinophilic esophagitis or healthy control subjects reveals that SIGLEC6 transcript is only detected in mast cells and not in any other cell types in this tissue. Other than mast cells, Siglec-6 expression has been detected on exhausted tissue-like B cells and a minor population of dendritic cells (DCs) known as AXL+ SIGLEC6+ (AS) DCs. Siglec-6 has also been found on chronic lymphocytic leukemia and acute myeloid leukemia cells and is being explored as a target of CAR T cell therapy.

== Ligand binding ==
Siglec-6 was identified in a screen for leptin-binding proteins, although it interacted with leptin with reduced affinity relative to the leptin receptor. As a member of the Siglec family of receptors with a conserved arginine residue necessary for sialic acid binding, Siglec-6 was expected to interact with its ligands in a sialic acid-dependent manner. However, leptin is not sialylated, and binding to Siglec-6 must therefore be sialic acid independent. The physiological relevance of this interaction has not been determined. Glycodelin A binding to trophoblast cell lines was found to be dependent on sialic acid and competitive with leptin binding. Glycodelin A co-immunoprecipitated with chimeric Siglec-6-Fc protein in this study, indicating a direct interaction between the proteins, which was also reduced upon the enzymatic removal of sialic acid from glycodelin A. Neither the relevant sialic acid linkage nor the remainder of the glycan structure on glycodelin A necessary for Siglec-6 binding are known. No physiological Siglec-6 ligands with apparent connections to mast cell biology have been identified. Initial studies found that Siglec-6 binds to sialyl-Tn antigen (Neu5Acα2–6GalNAcα) but not to Tn antigen (GalNAcα), 6′-sialyl-lactose (Neu5Acα2–6Galβ1–4Glc), or 3′-sialyl-lactose (Neu5Acα2–3Galβ1–4Glc). Further characterization of the glycan binding specificity of Siglec-6 revealed that Siglec-6, consistent with other members of the Siglec family, requires the carboxyl group on sialic acid, but is unique in that it does not require the glycolyl group of sialic acid for binding.

== Signaling and function ==
Siglec-6 contains in its cytoplasmic domain two known signaling motifs identified as an immunoreceptor tyrosine-based inhibitory motif (ITIM) and an immunoreceptor tyrosine-based switch motif (ITSM). Based on the presence of these motifs, it was presumed that Siglec-6 exerts an inhibitory effect on signaling cascades initiated by an immunoreceptor tyrosine-based activation motif (ITAM)-bearing receptor through the recruitment and activation of protein tyrosine phosphatases like SHP-1/2.

=== Placental trophoblasts ===
By introducing mutated versions of Siglec-6 lacking the key tyrosine residues in the ITIM, the ITSM, or both into a trophoblast cell line and treating the cell with the phosphatase inhibitor pervanadate, it was determined that both motifs are capable of being phosphorylated and that Siglec-6 is able to recruit SHP-2 upon phosphorylation of these motifs. Furthermore, binding of glycodelin A to trophoblast cell lines was found to reduce ERK1/2 phosphorylation, c-Jun protein and mRNA levels, MMP2 and uPA mRNA levels, and invasiveness in a sialic acid- and Siglec-6-dependent manner, suggesting that Siglec-6 reduces trophoblast invasiveness in response to encountering glycodelin A expression in the decidualized endometrium.

=== Mast cells ===
Antibody ligation of Siglec-6 on human CD34+ progenitor-derived mast cells inhibited GM-CSF secretion and slightly reduced degranulation in response to IgE crosslinking, although IL-8 secretion in response to stimulation was not similarly affected. This observation of Siglec-6 inhibitory function on mast cells was expanded to human skin-derived mast cells and the G protein-coupled receptors MRGPRX2 and C5aR, in addition to the ITAM-bearing FcεRI. Antibody ligation of Siglec-6 reduced mast cell degranulation in response to lower levels of the stimuli that act through these receptors. However, much more potent inhibition was observed by co-crosslinking Siglec-6 and FcεRI through the use of a secondary crosslinking antibody or the use of streptavidin-based tetramers of antibodies targeting Siglec-6 and FcεRI. Additionally, the inhibitory effect of Siglec-6 ligation remained for at least 4.5 hours, perhaps due to the observed stability of the receptor on the cell surface following antibody ligation, suggesting that the receptor may continue to participate in inhibitory signaling for prolonged periods of time.

=== Exhausted tissue-like B cells ===
Knockdown of SIGLEC6 using siRNA in exhausted tissue-like B cells from HIV-infected individuals enhances the ability of these cells to proliferate or secrete CCL3 or IL-6 upon stimulation. The lack of known Siglec-6 ligand in this system suggests that Siglec-6 may be reducing responsiveness of these cells through tonic signaling.
