= Elisabeth Gasteiger =

Swiss bioinformatician

Elisabeth Gasteiger is a Swiss bioinformatician known for her work in developing and managing tools for protein analysis. Her efforts have been instrumental in advancing proteomics research, particularly through her contributions to the ExPASy (Expert Protein Analysis System), a bioinformatics resource platform. She currently holds the position of Senior User Experience and Support Manager at the Swiss Institute of Bioinformatics (SIB).

== Career ==
Gasteiger's work at the Swiss Institute of Bioinformatics (SIB) has been instrumental in the development and enhancement of key bioinformatics resources, including the UniProt database, an integrated platform that combines protein sequence data from Swiss-Prot, TrEMBL, and PIR, as well as the ExPASy platform, which provides a suite of tools to support protein sequence analysis and related research.

She has played a pivotal role in the development and enhancement of the ExPASy (Expert Protein Analysis System) platform, coordinating software development within the Swiss-Prot group at SIB and overseeing the ExPASy server.

One of her notable contributions is the development of ProtParam, a tool hosted on the ExPASy server that allows researchers to compute various physical and chemical parameters of a protein sequence, such as its molecular weight, theoretical pI, amino acid composition, and extinction coefficient.

In her role as User Experience & Support Manager with the Swiss-Prot Group at SIB, she contributed to the deployment of the Cellosaurus database on the ExPASy platform in May 2015, significantly enhancing its development as a standalone resource for life sciences research.

She has also contributed to other bioinformatics resources, including the creation of the ABCD database, a repository for chemically defined antibodies, which serves as a valuable resource for researchers in the field of immunology. Additionally, she has been associated with the development of the Glycomics@ExPASy platform, which aims to bridge the gap in glycomics research by providing access to a variety of databases and tools dedicated to the study of glycans and glycoproteins.

Her ongoing work has contributed to the success of UniProt as a leading resource for protein sequence classification, annotation, and functional analysis, supporting researchers worldwide in molecular biology, genomics, and proteomics.

She has been instrumental in providing critical support to researchers by developing and managing bioinformatics tools that improve the accessibility and accuracy of protein sequence data.

== Selected publications ==
- Gasteiger, E., Hoogland, C., Gattiker, A., Duvaud, S., Wilkins, M. R., Appel, R. D., Bairoch, A. (2003). "ExPASy: SIB bioinformatics resource portal." Nucleic Acids Research, 31(13), 3787–3793. doi:10.1093/nar/gkg557.
- Gasteiger, E., Hoogland, C., Gattiker, A., Duvaud, S., Wilkins, M. R., Appel, R. D., Bairoch, A. (2005). "Protein identification and analysis tools on the ExPASy server." In: Walker, J. M. (ed.), The Proteomics Protocols Handbook, pp. 571–607. Humana Press. doi:10.1385/1-59259-890-0:571.
- Gasteiger, E., Jung, E., Bairoch, A. (2001). "The SWISS-PROT protein sequence database and its applications in proteomics." Bioinformatics, 17(2), 305–306. doi:10.1093/bioinformatics/17.2.305.
- Boeckmann, B., Bairoch, A., Apweiler, R., Blatter, M. C., Estreicher, A., Gasteiger, E., et al. (2003). "The SWISS-PROT protein knowledgebase and its applications to proteomics." Bioinformatics, 19(2), 1–10. doi:10.1093/bioinformatics/19.2.1.
- Gasteiger, E., UniProt Consortium. (2001). "UniProt: The universal protein knowledgebase." Nucleic Acids Research, 46(D1), D136–D139. doi:10.1093/nar/gkx1098.
- Gasteiger, E., UniProt Consortium. (2009). "The protein knowledgebase: UniProt and its applications." Bioinformatics, 25(11), 1626–1637. doi:10.1093/bioinformatics/btp183.
