= Healthcare in Switzerland =

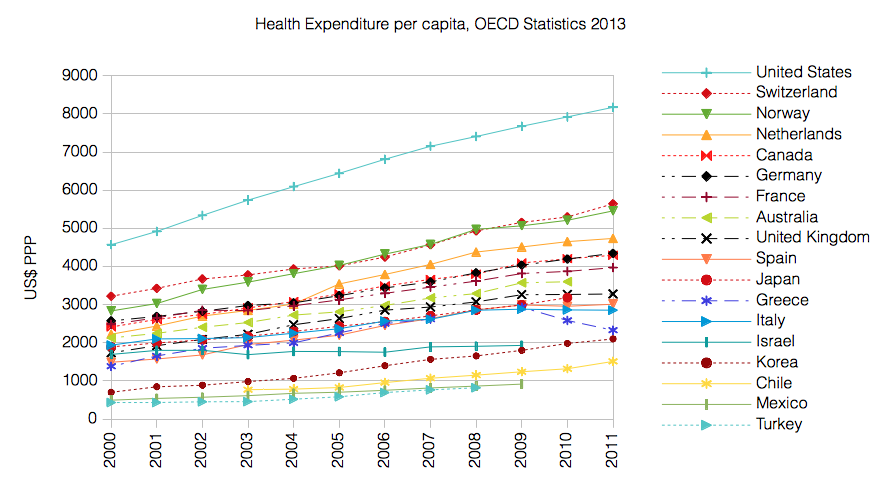
Health Expenditure per capita (in PPP-adjusted US$) among several OECD member nations. Data source: OECD's iLibrary

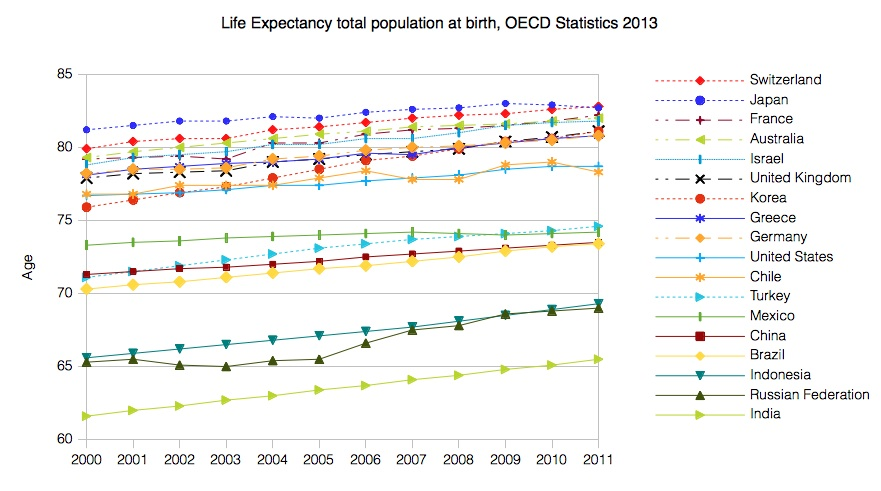
Life Expectancy of the total population at birth from 2000 until 2011 in Switzerland compared to several other nations. Data source: OECD's iLibrary

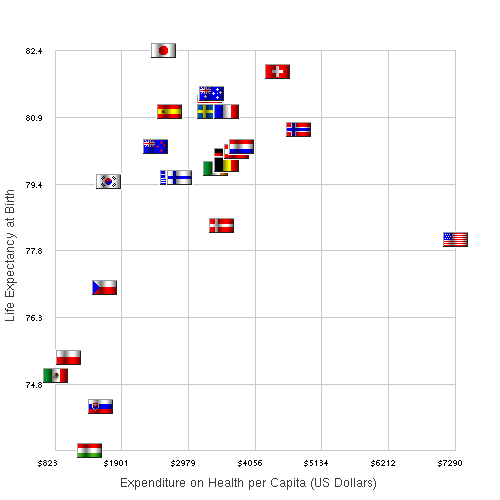
Healthcare spending vs life expectancy for some countries in 2007

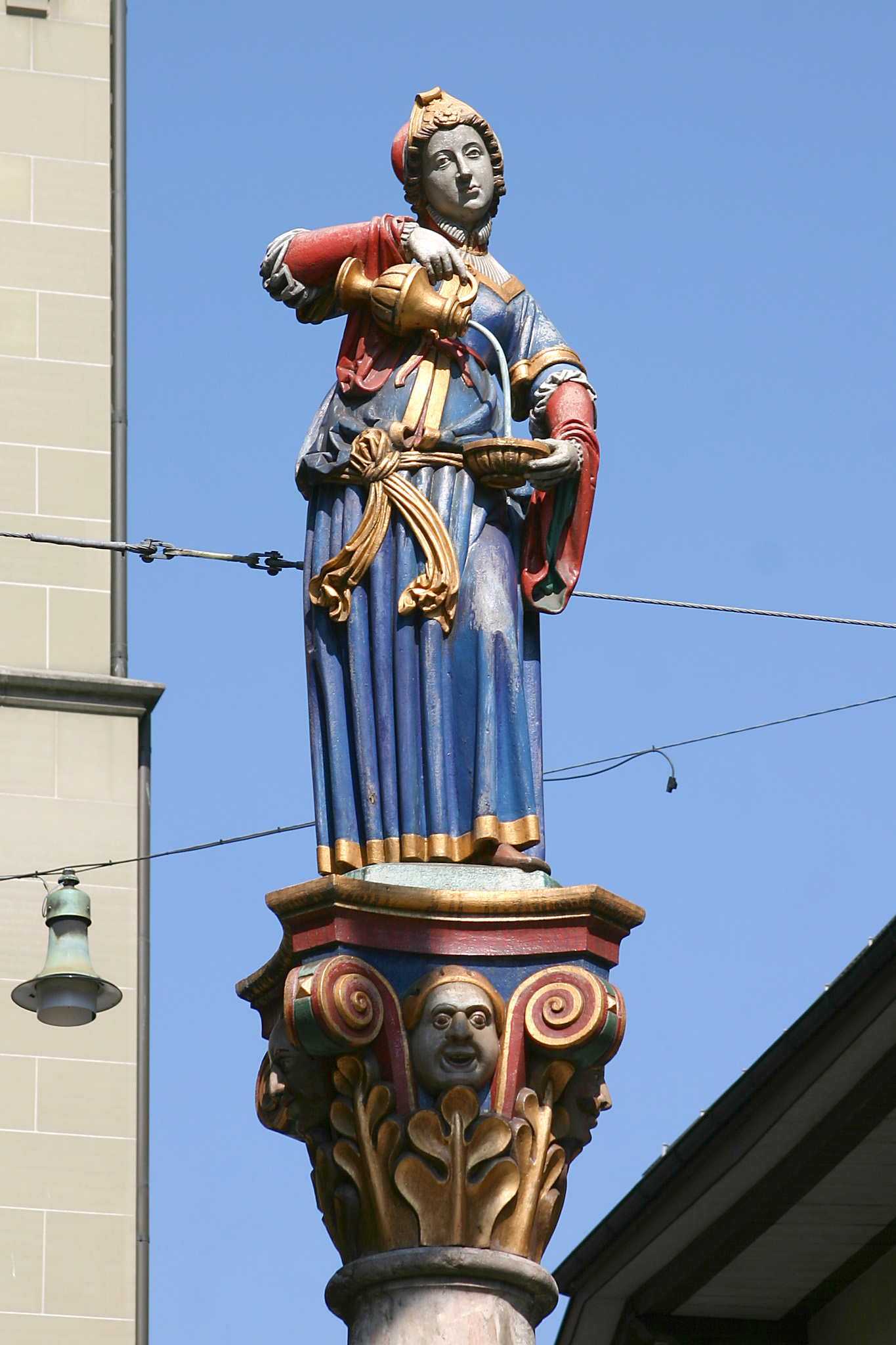
Statue of Anna Seiler, founder of Bern's Inselspital in 1354

Switzerland has universal health care, regulated by the Swiss Federal Law on Health Insurance. There are no free state-provided health services, but private health insurance is compulsory for all persons residing in Switzerland (within three months of taking up residence or being born in the country).

Health insurance covers the costs of medical treatment and hospitalisation of the insured. However, the insured person pays part of the cost of treatment. This is done (a) by means of an annual deductible (called the franchise), which ranges from CHF 300 (PPP-adjusted US$ 489) to a maximum of CHF 2,500 (PPP-adjusted $4,076) for an adult as chosen by the insured person (premiums are adjusted accordingly) and (b) by a charge of 10% of the costs over and above the excess up to a stop-loss amount of CHF 700 (PPP-adjusted $1,141).

== Coverage ==
=== Compulsory coverage and costs ===
Since 1994, all Swiss residents are required by federal law to purchase basic health insurance, which covers a range of treatments detailed in the Swiss Federal Law on Health Insurance (German: Krankenversicherungsgesetz (KVG); French: la loi fédérale sur l’assurance-maladie (LAMal); Italian: legge federale sull’assicurazione malattie (LAMal)). It is therefore the same throughout the country and avoids double standards in healthcare. Insurers are required to offer this basic insurance to everyone, regardless of age or medical condition. They operate as non-profits with this basic mandatory insurance but as for-profit on supplemental plans.

The insured person pays the insurance premium for the basic plan. If a premium is too high compared to the person's income, the government gives the insured person a cash subsidy to help pay for the premium.

The universal compulsory coverage provides for treatment in case of illness or accident (unless another accident insurance provides the cover) and pregnancy.

Health insurance covers the costs of medical treatment and hospitalization of the insured. However, the insured person pays part of the cost of treatment. This is done by these ways:

- by means of an annual excess (or deductible, called the franchise), which ranges from CHF 300 (PPP-adjusted US$ 489) to a maximum of CHF 2,500 (PPP-adjusted $4,076) for an adult as chosen by the insured person (premiums are adjusted accordingly);
- by a charge of 10% of the costs over and above the excess. This is known as the retention and is up to a maximum of 700CHF (PPP-adjusted $1,141) per year.

In case of pregnancy, there is no charge. For hospitalisation, one pays a contribution to room and service costs.

Insurance premiums vary from insurance company to company (health insurance funds; German: Krankenkassen; French: caisses-maladie; Italian: casse malati), the excess level chosen (franchise), the place of residence of the insured person and the degree of supplementary benefit coverage chosen (complementary medicine, routine dental care, half-private or private ward hospitalisation, etc.).

In 2014, the average monthly compulsory basic health insurance premiums (with accident insurance) in Switzerland are the following:

- CHF 396.12 (PPP-adjusted US$ 646) for an adult (age 26+)
- CHF 363.55 (PPP-adjusted $593) for a young adult (age 19–25)
- CHF 91.52 (PPP-adjusted $149) for a child (age 0–18)

International civil servants, members of embassies, and their family members are exempted from compulsory health insurance. Requests for exemptions are handled by the respective cantonal authority and have to be addressed to them directly.

=== Private coverage ===
The compulsory insurance can be supplemented by private "complementary" insurance policies that allow for coverage of some of the treatment categories not covered by the basic insurance or to improve the standard of room and service in case of hospitalisation. This can include complementary medicine, routine dental treatments, half-private or private ward hospitalisation, and others, which are not covered by the compulsory insurance.

=== Premiums ===
As far as the compulsory health insurance is concerned, the insurance companies cannot set any conditions relating to age, sex or state of health for coverage. Although the level of premium can vary from one company to another, they must be identical within the same company for all insured persons of the same age group and region, regardless of sex or state of health. This does not apply to complementary insurance, where premiums are risk-based.

=== Standardised financing of benefits ===
In the referendum of 24 November 2024, the uniform financing of healthcare benefits was accepted:

Uniform financing of healthcare benefits from 2028 8
	Until 2027	From 2028
Outpatient care	100 % health insurance	Maximum 73 % health insurance Minimum 27 % cantons
Hospital care	Maximum 45 % health insurance Minimum 55 % cantons	Maximum 73 % health insurance Minimum 27 % cantons
Retirement home and home care	About 54 % health insurance About 46 % cantons	Maximum 73 % health insurance Minimum 27 % cantons

== Organization ==
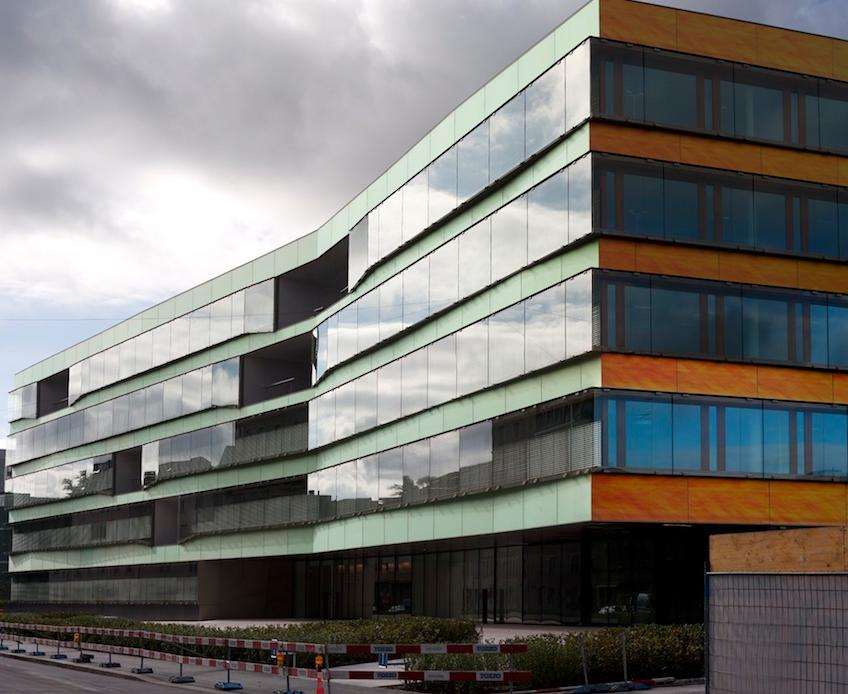
Children's hospital in Basel, Switzerland

The Swiss healthcare system is a combination of public, subsidised private and totally private systems:

- public: e. g. the University Hospital of Geneva (HUG) with 2,350 beds, 8,300 staff and 50,000 patients per year;
- subsidised private: the home care services to which one may have recourse in case of a difficult pregnancy, after childbirth, illness, accident, handicap or old age;
- totally private: doctors in private practice and in private clinics.

The insured person has full freedom of choice among the recognised healthcare providers competent to treat their condition (in their region) on the understanding that the costs are covered by the insurance up to the level of the official tariff. There is freedom of choice when selecting an insurance company (provided it is an officially registered caisse-maladie or a private insurance company authorised by the federal law) to which one pays a premium, usually on a monthly basis.

The list of officially approved insurance companies can be obtained from the cantonal authority.

=== Electronic health records ===
Before the discussions about a nationwide implementation, electronic health records were widely used in both private and public healthcare organizations.

In 2007, the Swiss Federal Government approved a national strategy for adoption of e-health. A central element of this strategy is a nationwide electronic health record. Following the federal tradition of Switzerland, it is planned that the infrastructure will be implemented in a decentralized way, i.e., using an access and control mechanism for federating existing records. In order to govern legal and financial aspects of the future nationwide EHR implementation, a bill was passed by the Swiss Federal Government in 2013 but left open questions regarding mandatory application. The Federal Act on the Electronic Patient Record came into force on 15 April 2017, but the records were not universally available until 2020. It will be extended to birth centres and nursing homes in 2022. Both patients and clinicians can store and access health data in the records.

=== Swiss Personalized Health Network ===
The Swiss Personalized Health Network (SPHN) is a federal initiative launched in 2017 to make patient data securely available for research in Switzerland. As of 2025, it involves over 1,000 researchers and clinicians and provides consented data from more than 700,000 patients. SPHN’s infrastructure includes national health data standards, the BioMedIT network as a trusted research environment, and a Data Coordination Center supported by CHF 20.7 million in federal funding.

BioMedIT is a secure national computing network coordinated by the SIB Swiss Institute of Bioinformatics to support biomedical research involving sensitive patient data. It consists of nodes in Basel, Lausanne, and Zurich, and provides researchers with a protected environment and technical support for analyzing clinical data, operating under the SPHN information security policy.

== Healthcare providers ==
=== Primary care ===
The ‘netCare’ scheme for minor ailments was introduced nationally in 2016. Pharmacists conduct a standardised triage and can prescribe medication. They can also have an unscheduled teleconsultation with a physician.

=== Hospitals ===
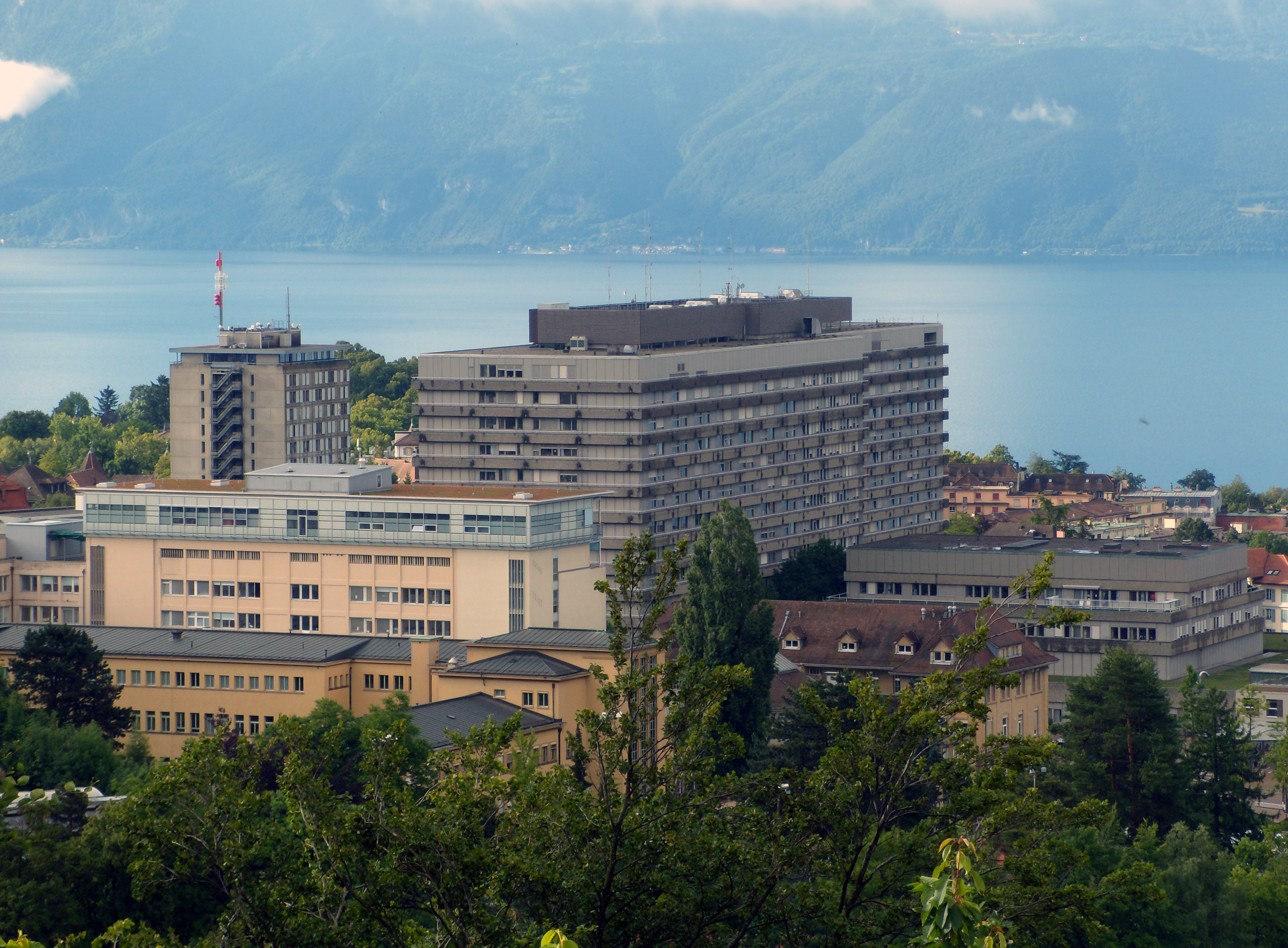
View of the University Hospital of Lausanne (CHUV) and Lake Léman

According to official statistics in 2021, 19,532 hospitalisations were due to mental health illness and 19,243 for physical injuries.

== Statistics ==
Healthcare costs in Switzerland are 11.4% of GDP (2010), comparable to Germany and France (11.6%) and other European countries, but significantly less than in the USA (17.6%). By 2015 the cost had risen to 11.7% of GDP -the second highest in Europe. Benefits paid out as a percentage of premiums were 90.4% in 2011. Total gross benefits per person and per year in 2011 were CHF 3,171 (PPP-adjusted US$5,168), of which CHF 455 (PPP-adjusted $742) are cost sharing.

According to the OECD Switzerland has the highest density of nurses among 27 measured countries, namely 17.4 nurses per thousand people in 2013. The density of practising physicians is 4 per thousand population.

In the 2018 Euro health consumer index survey Switzerland was placed first overtaking the Netherlands, and described as an excellent, although expensive, healthcare system.

Switzerland has the highest rate of psychiatrists per population in the OECD (Iceland has half as many psychiatrists as in Switzerland and is ranked second).

Patients in psychiatric clinics can be subjected to medication against their will, isolation and restraint. One in four patients in psychiatric services is now hospitalized against their will. "This figure is surprisingly high compared to other European countries" according to Swiss sources.

In September 2024, the Federal Office of Public Health (FOPH) announced that health insurance premiums in Switzerland would rise by an average of 6% in 2025. The increase was attributed to higher demand for services, new treatments, and drug costs. The shift from inpatient to outpatient care, while reducing system-wide expenses, was also cited as a factor contributing to higher premiums, as outpatient treatment is funded through compulsory insurance. Later that year, the UBS Worry Barometer found that 48% of Swiss residents viewed healthcare policy as a top concern, linking the rise in public anxiety to increasing insurance costs.

According to a 2024 forecast by the Swiss Federal Institute of Technology’s Center for Economic Research (KOF), healthcare spending in Switzerland is expected to reach CHF 99.1 billion in 2024, rising to CHF 103 billion in 2025 and CHF 106 billion by 2026. This corresponds to 12% of gross domestic product (GDP) in 2024, increasing to 12.2% by 2026. The primary drivers of this increase include long-term care services, hospitals, nursing homes, and doctors’ surgeries, reflecting both demographic aging and rising service volumes.

Nearly half (44%) of the costs of mandatory health insurance, amounting to just over 17 billion francs, are incurred by those over 65. Mandatory insurance, in turn, accounts for approximately 45% of total healthcare expenditure, which reached 94 billion francs in 2023.

== Popular votes ==
Between 1848 and 2024, Swiss citizens voted 69 times on health topics, including 34 votes between 2000 and 2024. The acceptance rate of health-related initiatives was higher than the overall average for all popular votes.

In November 2024, Swiss voters approved a reform to extend public funding to outpatient care, which had previously been covered only by insurers or patients. The measure, which passed with 53.3% support, aims to save CHF 440 million annually by shifting care from hospitals to less costly outpatient settings. Critics, including Social Democrats and unions, argued that the reform increases insurer influence without addressing affordability for patients.

== See also ==
- Health in Switzerland
- Swiss Personalized Health Network
- Healthcare in Europe
- Healthcare in Liechtenstein
- Medical schools
- Pharmaceutical industry in Switzerland
