= Christophe Dessimoz =

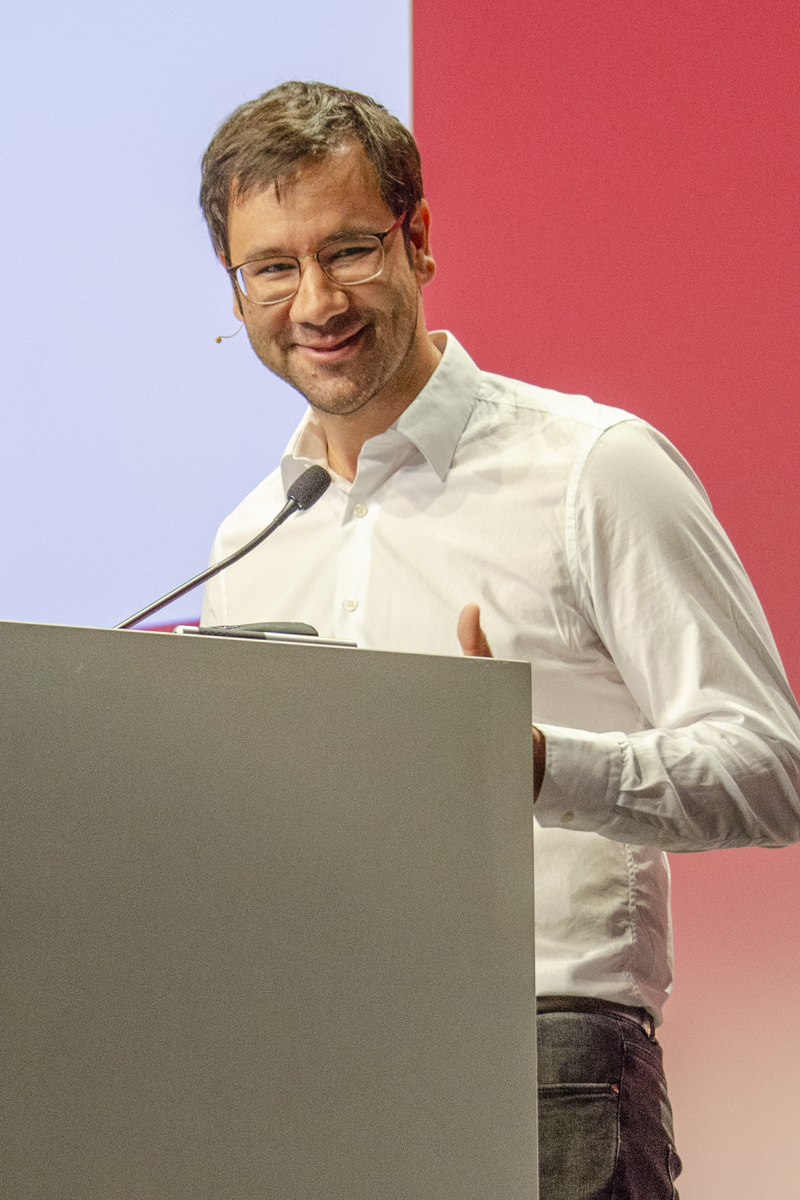
- Christophe Dessimoz speaking at the Intelligent Systems for Molecular Biology (ISMB) / European Conference on Computational Biology (ECCB) in Basel, 2019
- Born: Christophe Dessimoz; 1980 (age 45–46)
- Education: ETH Zurich (MSc, PhD)
- Known for: Orthologous MAtrix (OMA)
- Awards: Overton Prize (2019)
- Scientific career
- Fields: Bioinformatics; Genomics; Phylogenetics; Evolution; Computational Biology
- Workplaces: University of Lausanne; European Bioinformatics Institute; University College London; Swiss Institute of Bioinformatics
- Thesis: Comparative Genomics Using Pairwise Evolutionary Distances (2009)
- Doctoral advisor: Gaston Gonnet
- Website: lab.dessimoz.org/people/christophe-dessimoz

Christophe Dessimoz is a Swiss National Science Foundation (SNSF) Professor at the University of Lausanne, Associate Professor at University College London and a group leader at the Swiss Institute of Bioinformatics. He was awarded the Overton Prize in 2019 for his contributions to computational biology. Starting in April 2022, he will be joint executive director of the SIB Swiss Institute of Bioinformatics, along with Ron Appel.

== Education ==
Dessimoz obtained his Master of Science degree in 2003 and PhD in Computer Science in 2009 from ETH Zurich in Switzerland where his doctoral research was supervised by Gaston Gonnet and examined by Amos Bairoch.

== Career and research ==
After postdoctoral research at the European Bioinformatics Institute (EBI) on the Wellcome Genome Campus in Hinxton, Cambridgeshire, he joined University College London (UCL) as lecturer in 2013, and was promoted to Reader in 2015. In 2015, he joined the University of Lausanne as professor, retaining an appointment at UCL. Since 2016, Dessimoz has served as group leader at the Swiss Institute of Bioinformatics where his research interests are in bioinformatics, genomics, phylogenetics, evolution and computational biology.

Dessimoz is known for his management of the Orthologous MAtrix (OMA) which provides information on orthologous proteins. OMA has important applications in protein function prediction. Dessimoz's approach to benchmarking had a major impact on three key subfields of computational biology: orthology inference, sequence alignment, and the gene ontology (GO).

=== Awards and honours ===
Dessimoz was awarded the Overton Prize by the International Society for Computational Biology (ISCB) in 2019 for outstanding contributions to computational biology.
