= Beat H. Gähwiler =

Swiss neuroscientist

- Born: Beat H. Gähwiler; February 10, 1940 (age 86); Zug, Switzerland
- Known for: Organotypic slice cultures Synaptic transmission Synaptic plasticity
- Scientific career
- Fields: Biology

Beat H. Gähwiler (born February 10, 1940, in Zug, Switzerland), is a Swiss emeritus professor in neuroscience at the Brain Research Institute of the University of Zurich, Switzerland.

== Biography ==
Gähwiler received his diploma in physics from the University of Fribourg, Switzerland, in 1966. He earned his PhD degree in 1969 and his habilitation in 1979, both from the University of Basel. After three years as a postdoctoral fellow at the University of California, Berkeley, Gähwiler joined Sandoz Pharmaceuticals as head of a research laboratory, while teaching at the University of Basel. In 1987, he was appointed professor of neurophysiology at the Brain Research Institute, University of Zurich, where he served as director/co-director until 2005. In 1996, Gähwiler was appointed Newton-Abraham Visiting Professor at the University of Oxford, as well as Professorial Fellow at Lincoln College. In addition, he spent research time at the Department of Pharmacology of the Australian National University in Canberra, the Department of Neurological Surgery of University of Washington in Seattle, and the Institute of Biomedicine at the University of Seville.

He was married to the archaeologist Theres Gähwiler-Walder (1943-2012). He participated in several of her field studies in Colombia.

== Scientific contributions ==
Gähwiler's research has been at the interface of neurophysiology, neuromorphology, and neuropharmacology. To study nervous tissue under well-controlled experimental conditions, he established the organotypic slice culture technique, whereby thin slices of nervous tissue derived from any brain region of young rats or mice can be maintained in vitro for several weeks to months. Novel three-dimensional organoid brain cultures in part build on methodologies developed with slice culture techniques.

Gähwiler studied network activity in three brain areas. In the hypothalamus, his research focused on the characterization of interactions between co-cultured hypothalamic and hypophyseal tissue, on the identification of the chemosensitivity of hypothalamic neurons, and on the mechanisms involved in the generation of endogenous rhythmicity.

His early work in the cerebellum was among the first quantitative pharmacological studies using cultured CNS tissue. Using advanced electrophysiological and microfluorometric methods, Gähwiler was able to identify the types of amino-acid receptors on Purkinje cells and the nature of climbing fiber responses in olivo-cerebellar co-cultures.

In the hippocampus, Gähwiler has made major contributions in the fields of opioids, acetylcholine, epilepsy, amino-acid receptors, and synaptic plasticity. Particularly interesting were the studies about cholinergic interactions in the hippocampus, done in collaboration with David Brown. In septo-hippocampal co-cultures, stimulation of cholinergic fibers reduced particular potassium currents, thus providing the first description of cholinergic slow excitatory postsynaptic currents in the mammalian central nervous system. In addition, the group of Gähwiler demonstrated that activation of metabotropic glutamate receptors induced effects simulating activation of cholinergic fibers.

Questions concerning the origin and propagation of epileptic activity in the hippocampus have been of major interest to Gähwiler. Together with Scott Thompson, he has studied the role of ion transporters in the modulation of GABAergic synapses and characterized the presynaptic receptors controlling the release of neurotransmitters, mechanisms involved in the generation of epileptiform activity. They also succeeded in developing an in vitro model of chronic epilepsy that allowed them to analyze the morphological and functional consequences of long-term overexcitation.

Of particular importance are the achievements of Gähwiler's team in studying various aspects of synaptic plasticity and the development of neuronal networks in the hippocampus. In pioneering work, they illustrated the potential of slice cultures for studying the properties of synaptic transmission and plasticity between monosynaptically coupled cell pairs. Moreover, they showed that the continued activation of AMPA receptors is necessary for maintaining structure and function of central glutamatergic synapses whereas NMDA receptor activation limits the number of synaptic connections during hippocampal development. In addition, a developmental study established that stem cells are generated in hippocampal slice cultures and integrate normally into the hippocampal circuitry.

== Awards and honors ==
- 1970-1972 Fellowship of the Swiss Academy of Medical Sciences Official website
- 1988 Robert Bing Prize Official website of the Swiss Academy of Medical Sciences Official website
- 1990 Prize of the Doerenkamp/Zbinden Foundation
- 1996-1997 Newton-Abraham Visiting Professor at the University of Oxford, UK
- 2001-2008 President of the Roche Research Foundation, Basel, CH
- 2002 Bruno Ceccarelli Lecture, Università San Raffaele, Milano, IT
- 2002 Ragnar Granit Lecture, Karolinska Institute, Stockholm, SE
- 2002-2006 Chairman, Advisory Board Biozentrum, University of Basel
- 2005 Paul Broca Lecture, Lille, FR Official website
- 2011 Honorary Member of the Swiss Society for Neuroscience Official website
- 2014 Honorary Member of the Swiss Academy of Medical Sciences Official website
