= KHYG-1 =

Immortalized cell line

KHYG-1 is an immortalized cell line that bears the characteristics of NK cells. NK cells are a type of immune cell that are found in blood whose innate function is to kill viral infected cells, cells under stress and cancer cells. The KHYG-1 cell line was established in 1997 in the laboratory of M Yagita in the department of Clinical Immunology and Haematology, Tazuke-Kofukai Medical Research Institute, Kitano Hospital, Osaka, Japan. These cells were derived from the blood of 45-year old female suffering from aggressive Natural killer cell lymphoblastic leukemia/lymphoma. This cell line has been growing continuously, in the presence of IL-2, for 18 months after isolation and its doubling time is around 24-48h. The ability to proliferate was retained even after cryopreservation in liquid nitrogen.

== Phenotype and function ==
KHYG-1 cells present similar morphology to leukemic cells with large nucleus, coarse chromatin, conspicuous nucleoli, and abundant cytoplasm with large number of granules. They also represent similar immunophenotype to the primary leukemia cells (CD2^{+}, sCD3^{−}, CD7^{+}, CD8^{+}, CD56^{+} and HLA-DR^{+}) and they carry the same point mutation in exon 7 of the TP53 (p53) gene with the difference that they lack CD57 and CD1 but expresses CD33. In the same case as NK-92 cell line these cells do not express CD16 and are therefore unable to perform antibody dependent cellular cytotoxicity (ADCC) and so kills their targets mostly by secretion of lytic granules which contain pore-forming protein perforin and apoptosis-inducing proteins granulysin and granzyme. The KHYG-1 cells show superior cytotoxic activity against K562 cells, which is immortalised myelogenous leukemia cell line commonly used as a target for NK cells. KHYG-1 cells express activating receptors NKp44 and NKG2D. The expression of these receptors together with constitutively high expression level of granzyme M, which expression is restricted in primary NK cells, and fully processed cleaved perforin in their granules is thought to be the cause of the increased cytotoxicity of KHYG-1 cell line. They are also able to secrete cytokines such as IFNγ and TNFα which can afterwards stimulate other immune cells and effect immune reaction. These attributes of KHYG-1 cells together with their ability to retain their function after irradiation makes them an interesting cell line as a model to the study of the mechanism of NK cell leukemogenesis and as a potential effector cell in NK cell-mediated cancer immunotherapy.

== Clinical relevance ==
In recent years there have been studies trying to harness KHYG-1 cells as a potential "Off the Shelf" therapy, mostly to be genetically engineered to recognize and kill specific human cancers by expressing chimeric antigen receptors (CARs). CAR-T cells have been recognized as a promising agent in immune-oncology treatment as the infusion of these cells has been shown to induce remissions in some patients with acute and chronic leukemia and lymphoma. However, CAR-T cell therapy comes with the danger of causing cytokine release syndrome and their production is expensive and have to be personalized for each patient. So, several research groups have investigated the possibility of CAR-NK cells which would overcome some of the difficulties connected with CAR-T cells. Arwen Stikvoot has investigated the possibility of using KHYG-1 cell line and to create CD38 CARs in KHYG-1 cells as a therapy option for the treatment of Multiple myeloma. Tsutomu Nakazawa created KHYG-1 cells with EGFRvIII-specific CAR which inhibited the growth of glioblastoma cells in vitro via apoptosis. Roos Vincken and Ana Ruiz-Saenz created a protocol to engineer KHYG-1 cell line stably expressing FCγRIIIa (CD16) and so capable of antibody-dependent cellular cytotoxicity. As of January 2024, KHYG-1 cells have not yet been used in any clinical trial, unlike NK-92 cells.
