= ViralZone =

Swiss website with information about viruses

Content
- Description: virus diversity.
- Organisms: Virus

Contact
- Research center: Swiss Institute of Bioinformatics
- Authors: Philippe Le Mercier
- Primary citation: Hulo & al. (2011)
- Release date: 2010

Access
- Website: https://viralzone.expasy.org

ViralZone is a Swiss Institute of Bioinformatics web-resource for all viral genus and families, providing general molecular and epidemiological information, along with virion and genome figures.
