= Rhea (database) =

Online database of enzymes

Content
- Description: Expertly curated biochemical reaction database

Contact
- Research center: Swiss Institute of Bioinformatics (SIB)
- Primary citation: PMID 34755880
- Release date: 2012

Access
- Website: https://www.rhea-db.org
- Download URL: Download Rhea
- Web service URL: REST API
- Sparql endpoint: SPARQL endpoint

Rhea is a database of biochemical reactions maintained by the Swiss Institute of Bioinformatics (SIB). It provides standardized reaction equations using ChEBI structured, controlled chemical vocabulary. It serves as a reference resource for enzymes and transporters. Rhea is integrated with major biological databases including UniProt, Gene Ontology, and ExPASy. It supports searching by EC number and chemical identifiers.
