= TF-1 cell =

TF-1 cells are an immortal cell line derived from the human Erythroleukemia used in biomedical research. This cells are proliferatively responsive to interleukin-3 (IL-3) or granulocyte-macrophage colony-stimulating factor (GM-CSF). TF-1 cells have gene fusion of CBFA2T3-ABHD12.

== See also ==
Other cell lines in LL-100 panel
