= Amos Bairoch =

Swiss bioinformatician (1957–2025)

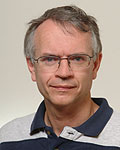
- Born: 22 November 1957
- Died: 29 November 2025 (aged 68)
- Education: University of Geneva
- Known for: Swiss-Prot; ExPASy
- Awards: Proteomics pioneer award (2013); Otto Naegeli prize (2010); European Latsis Prize (2004)
- Scientific career
- Fields: Computational biology; Bioinformatics; Proteomics
- Workplaces: Swiss Institute of Bioinformatics

Amos Bairoch (22 November 1957 – 29 November 2025) was a Swiss bioinformatician and Professor of Bioinformatics at the Department of Human Protein Sciences of the University of Geneva where he led the CALIPHO group at the Swiss Institute of Bioinformatics (SIB) combining bioinformatics, curation, and experimental efforts to functionally characterize human proteins.

His father was the economic historian Paul Bairoch.

== Early life and education ==
Bairoch was born on 22 November 1957. His first project as a PhD student was the development of PC/Gene, an MS-DOS–based software package for the analysis of protein and nucleotide sequences. PC/Gene was commercialized, first by a Swiss company (Genofit) then by Intelligenetics in the U.S. which was later bought by Oxford Molecular.

== Research ==
His main work is in the field of protein sequence analysis and more particularly in the development of databases and software tools for this purpose. His most important contribution is the input of human knowledge by careful manual annotation in protein-related data.

While working on PC/Gene he started to develop an annotated protein sequence database which became Swiss-Prot and was first released in July 1986. From 1988 onward, it has been a collaborative project with the Data Library group of the European Molecular Biology Laboratory which later evolved into the European Bioinformatics Institute (EBI).

The Swiss-Prot database is a freely accessible database of manually annotated protein sequences, used by bioinformaticians and laboratory-based scientists in a wide range of applications. Swiss-Prot has since been combined with TrEMBL and the Protein Information Resource (PIR) databases into a single, unified database known as UniProt.

In 1988, he started to develop PROSITE, a database of protein families and domains. A little while later he created ENZYME, a nomenclature database on enzymes as well as SeqAnalRef, a sequence analysis bibliographic reference database.

In collaboration with Ron Appel he initiated, in August 1993, the first molecular biology WWW server, ExPASy. What was intended as a prototype grew rapidly into a major site that provides access to the many databases produced partially or completely in Geneva as well as many tools for the analysis of proteins (proteomics).

In 1998, with colleagues in Geneva and Lausanne, he was one of the founders of the SIB Swiss Institute of Bioinformatics, whose mission is to establish in Switzerland a center of excellence in the field of bioinformatics with an emphasis on research, education, services and the developments of databases and tools.

In November 1997, together with Ron Appel and Denis Hochstrasser, he founded GeneBio (Geneva Bioinformatics SA), a company involved in biological knowledge. In April 2000, the above persons with Keith Rose and Robin Offord founded GeneProt (Geneva Proteomics), a high throughput proteomics company that ceased operations in 2005.

From 2009, in the framework of the CALIPHO group, directed by himself and Lydie Lane, he was involved in the development of neXtProt a resource which aims to provide life scientists with a broad spectrum of knowledge on all human proteins.

He was also involved in the development of the Cellosaurus a knowledge resource on cell lines.

According to Google Scholar and Scopus, As of 2015 his most highly cited peer reviewed papers in scientific journals have been published in Nucleic Acids Research, the Biochemical Journal, Nature, Briefings in Bioinformatics, and Database.

== Death ==
Bairoch died on 29 November 2025, at the age of 68.

== Awards and honours ==
Bairoch was the recipient of the 1993 Friedrich Miescher Award from the Swiss Society of Biochemistry, the 1995 Helmut Horten Foundation Incentive Award, the 2004 Pehr Edman award, the 2004 European Latsis Prize, the 2010 Otto Naegeli prize, the 2011 HUPO Distinguished Achievement Award in Proteomic Sciences, the 2013 EUPA proteomics pioneer award, in 2018 the ABRF Award, and the ISCB Accomplishments by a Senior Scientist award in 2025.

== Quotes ==
As the price keeps going down we're reaching the point where every genome that can be sequenced will be sequenced.
