= PtK2 cells =

Cell line

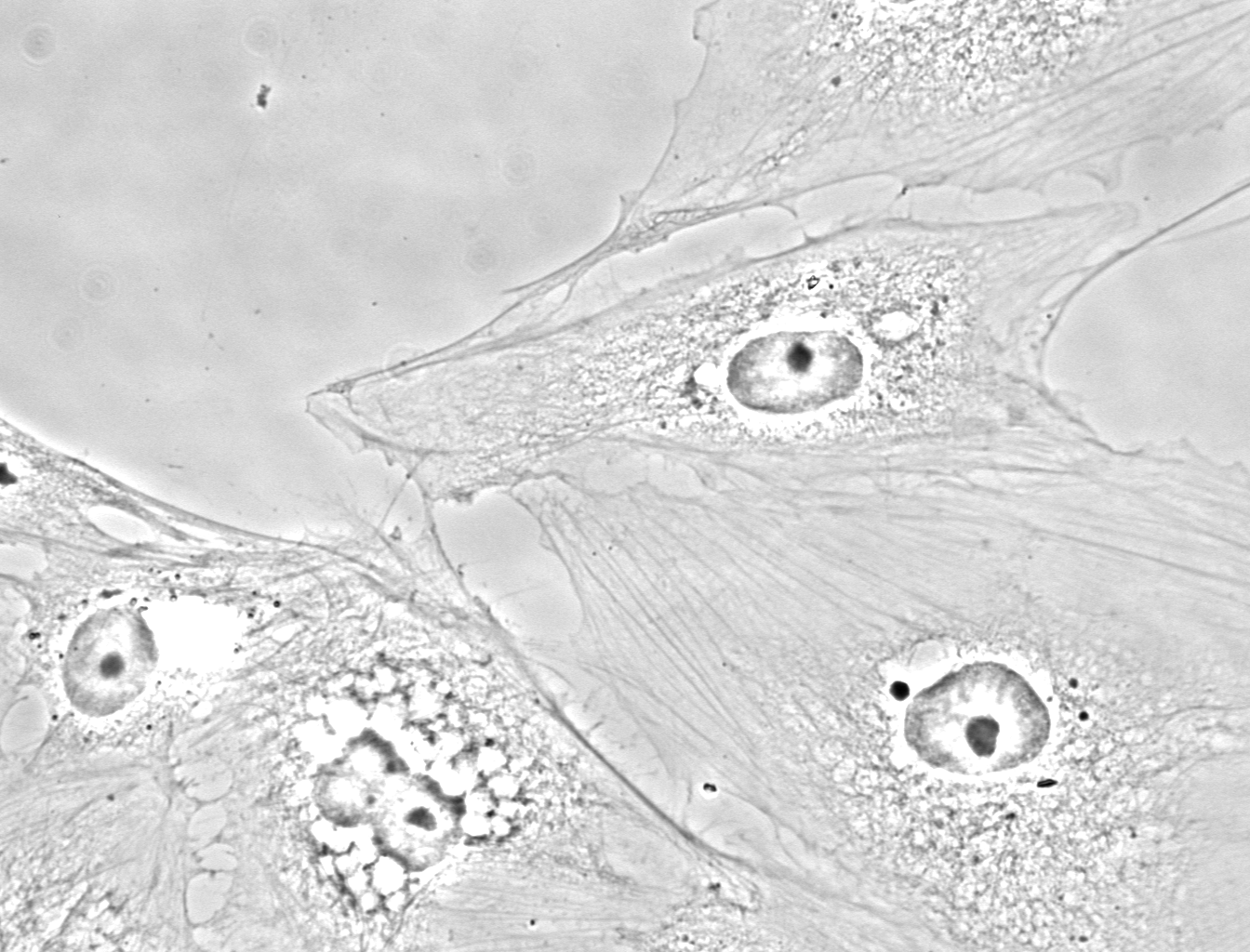
Phase contrast microscopy image of Potorous tridactylus kidney epithelial cells

PtK2 cells are a cell line derived from male long-nosed potoroo (Potorous tridactylis) epithelial kidney cells. This cell line is used for a variety of applications in biomedical research but is particularly popular as a model for mitosis.

== Origin ==
The PtK2 cell line was established by Kirsten Walen and Spencer Brown in 1962. Cells from the rat kangaroo were selected as the source of a cell line because this species has only a small number of chromosomes and these chromosomes are easily visualized under a microscope; mitosis becomes easy to observe, and the structural aspects of cell division can be closely examined.

== Characteristics ==
PtK2 cells are relatively large, and when grown in a monolayer, stay flat throughout the cell cycle - unlike many cells that round up during mitosis. PtK2 cells are resistant to adenovirus 5, coxsackievirus B5, and poliovirus 2. They are susceptible to coxsackievirus A9, herpes simplex, vaccinia, and vesicular stomatitis (Ogden strain). PtK2 cells contain intermediate filaments composed of Keratin.
