= Ernest Feytmans =

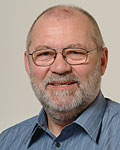

Prof. Ernest Feytmans (born 24 June 1943 in Brussels, Belgium) is a Belgian biologist and was director of the Swiss Institute of Bioinformatics between 2001 and September 2007.

Feytmans graduated in biology (in 1968) and statistics (in 1973) at the Catholic University of Leuven in Belgium, and obtained a PhD in 1973 following a thesis in Cell Biology with Jacques Berthet and Christian de Duve. After a postdoctoral fellowship at Rockefeller University with Christian de Duve, he became professor at the Catholic University of Santiago, in Chile. In 1975, he became full professor at Namur University, Belgium, where he was head of the department of biology, and then Chancellor from 1982 to 1987 and Dean of the faculty of sciences between 1991 and 1997.

In 1977, he was selected with four other Belgian candidates for European astronaut kit but was not selected to the detachment.

In 1997, he became Dean of the Faculty of Medical Sciences at the University of the West Indies and, in 2001, director of the Swiss Institute for Bioinformatics. In 2007, he became honorary director of the institute.
