= Bgee =

Gene expression database

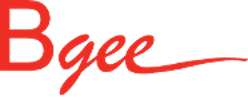
- Bgee gene expression database logo

Content
- Description: Gene expression across species and conditions
- Data types captured: scRNA-Seq, RNA-Seq, Microarray, In situ and EST Data
- Organisms: Human, Mouse, Rat, Fruit-fly, Chicken, Roundworm, Wild boar, Zebrafish, Cow and others.

Contact
- Research center: Swiss Institute of Bioinformatics; University of Lausanne
- Primary citation: PMID 33037820
- Release date: June 2007

Access
- Website: www.bgee.org
- Download URL: www.bgee.org
- Sparql endpoint: www.bgee.org/sparql/

Tools
- Web: Gene search TopAnat: Gene Expression Enrichment; Expression comparison Anatomical homology Raw data interface
- Standalone: bioconductor.org/packages/BgeeDB/ bioconductor.org/packages/BgeeCall/

Miscellaneous
- License: CC0 1.0 Universal
- Version: 15.2
- Curation policy: Manual curation of every study.

Bgee is a database maintained by the SIB Swiss Institute of Bioinformatics and the University of Lausanne for retrieval and comparison of gene expression patterns from RNA-Seq, scRNA-Seq, Microarray, In situ hybridization and EST studies, across multiple animal species. Bgee provides an intuitive answer to the question where is a gene expressed? and supports research in cancer and agriculture, as well as evolutionary biology.

Bgee is based exclusively on curated, healthy wild-type, expression data (i.e., no gene knock-out, no treatment, no disease), to provide a comparable reference of healthy wild-type gene expression.

Bgee produces calls of presence/absence of expression, and of differential over-/under-expression, integrated along with information of gene orthology, and of homology between organs. This allows comparisons of expression patterns between species.

Bgee allows searches by gene, organ / tissue / cell type and developmental stage.

Bgee is a part of Global Core Biodata Resources (GCBRs) and ELIXIR Core Data Resources representing "critical components for ensuring the reproducibility and integrity of life sciences research." Bgee is also an ELIXIR Recommended Interoperability Resources that facilitate the FAIR-supporting activities in scientific research.
