= PROSITE =

Database of protein domains, families and functional sites

Content
- Description: PROSITE, a protein domain database for functional characterization and annotation.

Contact
- Research center: Swiss Institute of Bioinformatics
- Laboratory: Structural Biology and Bioinformatics Department
- Primary citation: PMID 19858104
- Release date: 1988

Access
- Website: prosite.expasy.org

PROSITE is a protein database. It consists of entries describing the protein families, domains and functional sites as well as amino acid patterns and profiles in them. These are manually curated by a team of the Swiss Institute of Bioinformatics and tightly integrated into Swiss-Prot protein annotation. PROSITE was created in 1988 by Amos Bairoch, who directed the group for more than 20 years. Since July 2018, the director of PROSITE and Swiss-Prot is Alan Bridge.

PROSITE's uses include identifying possible functions of newly discovered proteins and analysis of known proteins for previously undetermined activity. Properties from well-studied genes can be propagated to biologically related organisms, and for different or poorly known genes biochemical functions can be predicted from similarities. PROSITE offers tools for protein sequence analysis and motif detection (see sequence motif, PROSITE patterns). It is part of the ExPASy proteomics analysis servers.

The database ProRule builds on the domain descriptions of PROSITE. It provides additional information about functionally or structurally critical amino acids. The rules contain information about biologically meaningful residues, like active sites, substrate- or co-factor-binding sites, posttranslational modification sites or disulfide bonds, to help function determination. These can automatically generate annotation based on PROSITE motifs.

== Statistics ==
As of 26 February 2022, release 2022_01 has 1,902 documentation entries, 1,311 patterns, 1,336 profiles, and 1,352 ProRules.

== See also ==
- Uniprot – the universal protein database, a central resource on protein information – PROSITE adds data to it.
- InterPro – a centralized database, grouping data from databases of protein families, domains and functional sites – part of the data come from PROSITE.
- Protein subcellular localization prediction – another example of use of PROSITE.
