= UTOPIA (bioinformatics tools) =

Bioinformatics software suite

- UTOPIA tools on a Mac
- Developers: Steve Pettifer, Terri Attwood, David Parry-Smith, D.N.Perkins, A.W. Payne, A.D. Michie, Phillip W.Lord, J.N.Selley, Phil McDermott, James Marsh, James Sinnott, Dave Thorne, Benjamin Blundell
- Written in: C++, Python
- Operating system: Linux, Mac and Windows
- Website: utopia.cs.manchester.ac.uk

UTOPIA (User-friendly Tools for Operating Informatics Applications) is a suite of free tools for visualising and analysing bioinformatics data. Based on an ontology-driven data model, it contains applications for viewing and aligning protein sequences, rendering complex molecular structures in 3D, and for finding and using resources such as web services and data objects. There are two major components, the protein analysis suite and UTOPIA documents.

== Utopia Protein Analysis suite ==
The Utopia Protein Analysis suite is a collection of interactive tools for analysing protein sequence and protein structure. Up front are user-friendly and responsive visualisation applications, behind the scenes a sophisticated model that allows these to work together and hides much of the tedious work of dealing with file formats and web services.

== Utopia Documents ==
Utopia Documents brings a fresh new perspective to reading the scientific literature, combining the convenience and reliability of the Portable Document Format (pdf) with the flexibility and power of the web.

== History ==
Between 2003 and 2005 work on UTOPIA was funded via The e-Science North West Centre based at The University of Manchester by the Engineering and Physical Sciences Research Council, UK Department of Trade And Industry, and the European Molecular Biology Network (EMBnet). Since 2005 work continues under the EMBRACE European Network of Excellence.

UTOPIA's CINEMA (Colour INteractive Editor for Multiple Alignments), a tool for Sequence Alignment, is the latest incarnation of software originally developed at The University of Leeds to aid the analysis of G protein-coupled receptors (GPCRs). SOMAP, a Screen Oriented Multiple Alignment Procedure was developed in the late 1980s on the VMS computer operating system, used a monochrome text-based VT100 video terminal, and featured context-sensitive help and pulldown menus some time before these were standard operating system features.

SOMAP was followed by a Unix tool called VISTAS (VIsualizing STructures And Sequences) which included the ability to render 3D molecular structure and generate plots and statistical representations of sequence properties.

The first tool under the CINEMA banner developed at The University of Manchester was a Java-based applet launched via web pages, which is still available but is no longer maintained. A standalone Java version, called CINEMA-MX, was also released but is no longer readily available.

A C++ version of CINEMA, called CINEMA5 was developed early on as part of the UTOPIA project, and was released as a stand-alone sequence alignment application. It has now been replaced by a version of the tool integrated with UTOPIA's other visualisation applications, and its name has reverted simply to CINEMA.
