= Swiss Personalized Health Network =

Swiss medical research project

- Keywords: Personalized medicine, personalized health, digital health
- Project type: Research infrastructure initiative
- Sponsors: State Secretariat for Education, Research and Innovation, Federal Office of Public Health
- Objective: To contribute to the development, the implementation, and the validation of a nationally coordinated infrastructure in order to make health-relevant data interoperable and shareable for research in Switzerland.
- Location: Switzerland
- Project coordinator: Swiss Academy of Medical Sciences, SIB Swiss Institute of Bioinformatics
- Participants: Swiss higher education institutions, (university) hospitals, research supports institutions, and patient organizations.
- Budget: Funding: CHF 20.7 million (2025–2028)
- Duration: 2017 – 2028
- Website: https://sphn.ch

The Swiss Personalized Health Network initiative (SPHN) was established in 2017 by the government of Switzerland. It is intended to develop personalized medicine and personalized health in Switzerland by harnessing previously segregated health data through establishing a harmonized framework on how to make different data formats interoperable (semantic interoperability) and by building a secure, coordinated IT infrastructure network, across Switzerland.

SPHN integrates health data from many electronic sources in line with Switzerland's federalism. SPHN rallies all Swiss stakeholders - from key clinical, research-, research support institutions and patient organizations - around the same table and builds upon (and supports) existing resources in Switzerland.

SPHN was commissioned by the Swiss State Secretariat for Education, Research and Innovation (SERI) and the Federal Office of Public Health. Both the Swiss Academy of Medical Sciences (SAMS) and the SIB Swiss Institute of Bioinformatics (SIB) are responsible for the implementation of the mandate. It received CHF 68 million for its initial phase from 2017 to 2020, followed by a second tranche of CHF 67 million for a subsequent implementation period. A third phase, running from 2025 to 2028, has been allocated CHF 20.7 million in federal funding.

The ethical, legal and social implications of personalized medicine are central to SPHN. Therefore, the SPHN Ethical, Legal and Societal Implications Advisory Group (ELSIag) was set up and tasked to address key ethical, legal and societal challenges that are relevant to the SPHN's activities.

== Governance and funding ==
From its launch in 2017 through 2024, SPHN was jointly coordinated by the Swiss Academy of Medical Sciences (SAMS) and the SIB Swiss Institute of Bioinformatics. During this implementation phase, it received CHF 68 million and CHF 67 million in federal funding from the State Secretariat for Education, Research and Innovation (SERI). According to the SIB, Swiss universities and hospitals additionally contributed matching funds to SPHN-supported projects.

For the 2025–2028 period, the Swiss Confederation allocated CHF 20.7 million to support the SPHN Data Coordination Center (DCC). SAMS retains responsibility for the federal mandate and continues to collaborate with SIB in consolidating SPHN as a national infrastructure.

== Research impact ==
The BioMedIT network, developed by the SIB Swiss Institute of Bioinformatics in collaboration with ETH Zurich and the University of Basel, is a secure computing infrastructure launched in 2017 as part of SPHN. As of 2022, it was fully operational and supported over 60 national and international health-related research projects. According to the SIB, these include the Personalized Swiss Sepsis Study (PSSS), which connects data from intensive care units, laboratories, and diagnostic systems to study early detection of bacterial sepsis. Other examples include the Swiss Variant Interpretation Platform for Oncology (SVIP-O) and the Swiss Pathogen Surveillance Platform (SPSP), which centralizes virus sequencing data. The BioMedIT network is based on three scientific IT platforms in Basel, Lausanne, and Zurich.

== IT security and data protection ==
As part of its infrastructure, SPHN supports BioMedIT, a secure network developed to facilitate the processing and exchange of sensitive health data across research institutions in Switzerland. SPHN focuses much of its efforts on training and awareness related to Data Privacy and IT Security to protect the patients’ privacy when performing biomedical research on human data.

== Ethical framework ==
The ethical principles guiding SPHN are outlined in its “Ethical Framework for Responsible Data Processing,” developed by the ELSIag. According to the Swiss Medical Weekly, the framework promotes four key principles: respect for persons, privacy, accountability, and data fairness. It is intended to guide ethical sustainability in research, ensure the protection of participant rights, and support public trust in data use.

== Collaboration with Swiss hospitals and clinical research networks ==
To enable the implementation of SPHN's core infrastructure aiming to make health-related data interoperable and shareable, SPHN funded ‘Infrastructure implementation projects’ through collaboration agreements with the five Swiss University Hospitals. SPHN started with the records held by University Hospitals. Later the cantonal hospitals and clinics will be included. It will have to cope with both structured and unstructured data in three national languages and English.

In 2024, SPHN launched a program to integrate cantonal hospitals into its infrastructure and the BioMedIT network. Participating institutions include Cantonal Hospital Lucerne (LUKS), Aarau (KSA), St. Gallen (KSSG), Baden (KSB), Ente Ospedaliero Cantonale (EOC), and the Swiss Group for Clinical Cancer Research (SAKK). These partners are aligning their data with international standards such as SNOMED CT and LOINC, and using tools like the SPHN Connector and Secure Encryption and Transfer Tool (sett) to ensure semantic interoperability and secure data transfer. SAKK will also contribute standardized oncology datasets from multiple hospitals. The initiative supports multi-site research and aims to improve access to clinical data for personalized medicine.

== Electronic patient record ==
The Electronic Patient Dossier (EPD) is a mandate of eHealth Suisse, a competency and coordination office of the Swiss Government. Although the EPD and SPHN both deal will health data, the EPD focuses on care data whereas SPHN focuses on research data. SPHN and eHealth Suisse collaborate on semantics and interoperability. Although the federal law on the electronic patient dossier (EPD) was agreed on in 2015, it only gave access to those directly involved in the patient's treatment.

In 2021, Torsten Schwede described Switzerland's clinical data infrastructure as fragmented, with records often split between paper and digital formats. He noted the absence of a unified, structured electronic medical record system where all health information flows together, limiting the potential for research and the application of technologies such as artificial intelligence.
