= IGRhCellID =

Content
- Description: genomic resources of human cell lines for identification.
- Organisms: Homo sapiens

Contact
- Research center: Academia Sinica
- Laboratory: Institute of Biomedical Sciences
- Authors: Cheng-Kai Shiau
- Primary citation: Shiau & al. (2011)
- Release date: 2010

Access
- Website: http://igrcid.ibms.sinica.edu.tw

IGRhCellID is a database of cell lines using some common tools to reduce cell lines misidentification.

== See also ==
- Cell line
