= HEL cell line =

The HEL cell line is an immortalised cell line from a 30-year old male Acute erythroid leukemia patient, used in biomedical research.

HEL cell is capable of induced globin synthesis, producing mainly Gγ and Aγ chains.

== See also ==
Other cell lines in LL-100 panel
