= Manuel Corpas (scientist) =

British bioinformatics researcher

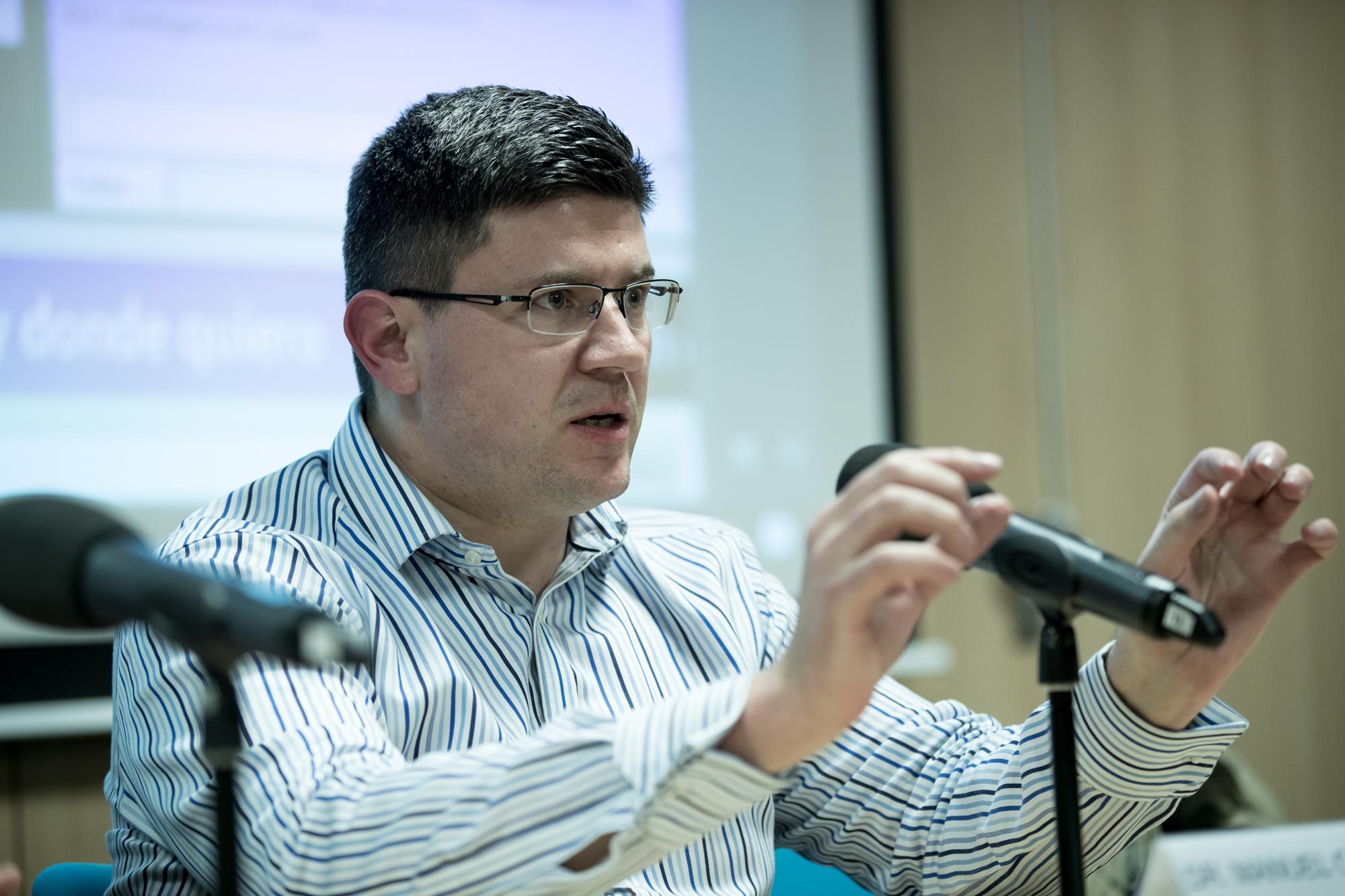
- Portrait of Manuel Corpas
- Born: Manuel Corpas Lopez; 1st June, 1977; Málaga, Spain
- Education: University of Navarra
- Known for: Corpasome; BioJS
- Awards: Software Sustainability Institute 2016
- Scientific career
- Fields: Bioinformatics; Genomics
- Workplaces: Wellcome Sanger Institute; Earlham Institute; Cambridge Precision Medicine; Universidad Internacional de La Rioja; Institute for Continuing Education
- Thesis: Folding Patterns in Protein Sequences (2007)
- Doctoral advisor: Terri Attwood
- Website: manuelcorpas.com; www.cpm.onl; www.ice.cam.ac.uk/about-us/staff-profiles/tutor/dr-manuel-corpas; www.unir.net/profesores/manuel-corpas/

Manuel Corpas is an Anglo-Spanish biologist and entrepreneur known primarily for his contributions to the field of Bioinformatics and Genomics. As of March 2026, he is Senior Lecturer in Genomics at the University of Westminster and a Fellow at the Alan Turing Institute. He served as Chief Scientist of Cambridge startup Cambridge Precision Medicine, a tutor at the Institute for Continuing Education at the University of Cambridge and a lecturer at the Universidad Internacional de La Rioja. Manuel worked on the human genome from the beginning of his career, being one of the first consumers to sequence his own genome and that of close relatives, which he published as the Corpasome. He has held positions at the Earlham Institute as Project Leader, and the Wellcome Sanger Institute, developing the DECIPHER database, a database that aids in the diagnosis of patients with rare genomic disorders.

== Education ==
Corpas gained his Bachelor of Science in Biology from the University of Navarra in 2000. He was awarded a PhD in Bioinformatics in 2007 by the University of Manchester under the supervision of Professor Terri Attwood and Dr Steve Pettifer studying the evolutionary conservation of folds in proteins.

== Academic service ==
During his PhD Corpas started the International Society for Computational Biology Student Council (ISCBSC), the international organisation of computational biology students. The International Society for Computational Biology officially approved the Student Council in 2004 with Corpas as its inaugural Chair. To date the Student Council has numerous Regional Student Groups around the world touching many thousands of students in the field. Corpas has also organised the first Student Council Symposium in Computational Biology at the European Conference in Computational Biology in Madrid (2005). Additionally, he served as the chair of the first conference of bioinformatics in Africa by the African Society for Bioinformatics and Computational Biology.

== Research and career ==
After a few months at the Spanish National Bioinformatics Institute in Madrid under Alfonso Valencia and the European Bioinformatics Institute under Ewan Birney, Corpas settled at the Wellcome Sanger Institute as developer of the DECIPHER database under the supervision of Dr Helen V. Firth. Since then he has been working in the field of human genome research and personal genomics. During his tenure at the Wellcome Sanger Institute he initially focused on the development of integration and visualisation tools for interpretation of Copy Number Variation datasets. A while later, he started his work in the 'Corpasome'. He was among the first people to make public on the internet his personal genotype from 23andMe, terming the process "genome blogging". Soon after his family analysed their genotypes using 23andMe data first and then human exome technology and more recently whole genome. This has led to a number of important publications in the field of personal genomics, performing the first crowdsourced analysis of a family of genomes. During the end of his tenure at the Sanger Institute he organised the BioJavaScript (BioJS) community, and served as its coordinator from 2012 until 2017. The BioJS community provides open source web components for biological visualisation. Corpas' research group has been involved in important developments of this open software community. BioJS involves efforts from world leading resources such as the European Bioinformatics Institute, the Berkeley Lab, Cambridge University and others. Corpas was successful in obtaining 5 internship for the Google Summer of Code, which catapulted BioJS as an international effort.

Corpas has also been the Technical Coordinator of ELIXIR-UK, the UK branch of the ELIXIR European network for bioinformatics and data resources. During his time as ELIXIR Technical coordinator he has been involved in the development of best practices and standardised metrics to measure the impact of data resources across Europe. During this time he also was involved in the Global Organisation for Bioinformatics Learning, Education and Training, acting as the chair of their technical committee and the development of their training portal, which provides open access training resources for the bioinformatics community.

As well as his work at Cambridge Precision Medicine, Manuel is a Tutor at the University of Cambridge Institute of Continuing Education, and also teaches online courses in precision medicine in both English and Spanish. Manuel has over 50 peer reviewed scientific publications to his name, and a book Perfect DNA, in which he explores the wider issues beyond the science of genetic sequencing.

As of March 2026, he is Senior Lecturer in Genomics at the University of Westminster, and a Fellow at both the Alan Turing Institute and the Software Sustainability Institute, where he works with artificial intelligence to gain insights from health data.

Spanish-language media outlets have covered Corpas's genomics work and related commentary.

== Awards and honours ==
Corpas is a fellow of the Software Sustainability Institute, and a frequent speaker in world renown events in genomics such as Festival of Genomics London, BioData West, the Longevity World Forum and others. He has been catalogued as one of the leading people in from Málaga (Spain) having an impact in the world.
