= Briefings in Bioinformatics =

- Discipline: Bioinformatics
- Language: English
- Edited by: Martin Bishop

Publication details
- History: 2000-present
- Publisher: Oxford University Press
- Frequency: Bimonthly
- Impact factor: 7.3 (2025)

Standard abbreviations
- ISO 4: Brief. Bioinform.

Indexing
- CODEN: BBIMFX
- ISSN: 1467-5463 (print); 1477-4054 (web)
- OCLC no.: 44107488

Links
- Journal homepage; Online access; Online archive

Briefings in Bioinformatics is a peer-reviewed scientific journal covering bioinformatics, including reviews of databases and analytical tools for genetics and molecular biology. It also publishes primary research papers on novel bioinformatic models and tools. It is published by Oxford University Press. The EMBnet community was initially involved in the creation of the journal. BiB was also supported by an educational grant from EMBnet.

== Abstracting and indexing ==
The journal is abstracted and indexed in:

- Current Contents/Life Sciences
- Abstracts on Hygiene and Communicable Diseases
- Animal Breeding Abstracts
- BIOSIS Previews
- Biological Abstracts
- Biotechnology Citation Index
- CAB Abstracts
- EMBASE
- Global Health
- ProQuest
- Science Citation Index Expanded

According to the Journal Citation Reports, the journal had a 2024 impact factor of 7.7.
