= NK-92 =

The NK-92 cell line is an immortalised cell line that has the characteristics of a type of immune cell found in human blood called 'natural killer' (NK) cells. Blood NK cells and NK-92 cells recognize and attack cancer cells as well as cells that have been infected with a virus, bacteria, or fungus. NK-92 cells were first isolated in 1992 in the laboratory of Hans Klingemann at the British Columbia Cancer Agency in Vancouver, Canada, from a patient who had a rare NK cell non-Hodgkin-lymphoma. These cells were subsequently developed into a continuously growing cell line. NK-92 cells are distinguished by their suitability for expansion to large numbers, ability to consistently kill cancer cells and testing in clinical trials. When NK-92 cells recognize a cancerous or infected cell, they secrete perforin that opens holes into the diseased cells and releases granzymes that kill the target cells. NK-92 cells are also capable of producing cytokines such as tumor necrosis factor alpha (TNF-a) and interferon gamma (IFN-y), which stimulates proliferation and activation of other immune cells.

== In clinical trials ==
Several phase 1 clinical trials have been performed by experts in the field of adoptive immunotherapy of cancer. Hans Klingemann and Sally Arai completed a US trial at Rush University Medical Center (Chicago) in renal cell cancer and melanoma patients in 2008, and Torsten Tonn, MD and Oliver Ottmann, MD completed the European trial at the University of Frankfurt in patients with various solid and hematological malignancies in 2013. Armand Keating at Princess Margaret Hospital in Toronto conducted a trial in which NK-92 cells were given to patients who had relapsed after autologous bone marrow transplants for leukemia or lymphoma. In all clinical trials so far, NK-92 cells were administered as a simple intravenous infusion, dosed two or three times per treatment course, and given in the outpatient setting.

Of the 39 patients enrolled across the three studies, 2 serious (grade 3–4) side-effects occurred during or after the infusion of NK-92 cells, the side effects disappeared afterward. The doses given to patients ranged from 1 × 10^{8} cells/m^{2} to 1 × 10^{10} cells/m^{2} per infusion. Patients received between two and three infusions over a period of less than a week. About one-third of the treated patients had clinically meaningful responses with some of them fully recovering.

== Comparison to other NK cells ==
In a 2017 study by Congcong Zhang and Winfried S. Wels, NK-92 cells were genetically engineered to recognize and kill specific human cancers by expressing chimeric antigen receptors (CARs). CAR-engineered T-lymphocytes (CAR-T) have garnered attention in immuno-oncology, as the infusion of CAR-T cells has been shown to induce remissions in some patients with acute and chronic leukemia and lymphoma. However, CAR-T cells can cause cytokine release syndrome (CRS). CAR-engineered NK cells from either peripheral or cord blood have not proved to be as feasible for use to treat diseases as they are difficult to expand to get sufficient numbers, and the yields can be variable and/or too low. Also, genetic transduction to introduce the CAR into blood NK cells requires lentiviral or retroviral vectors, which are only moderately efficient.

NK-92 cells, in contrast to NK-92 CAR-T cells, have predictable expansion kinetics and can be grown in bioreactors that produce billions of cells within a couple of weeks. Further, NK-92 cells can easily be transduced by physical methods, and mRNA can be shuttled into NK-92 cells with high efficiency. CAR-expressing NK-92 have been generated to target a number of cancer surface receptors such as programmed death domain ligand 1 (PD-L1), CD19 (a type of B cell receptor), human epidermal growth factor receptor 2 (HER2/ErbB2) and epidermal growth factor receptor (EGFR, aka HER1); and many of these engineered NK-92 cells are currently in clinical trials for the treatment of cancer.

== NK-92 variants ==
NK-92 cells, which require interleukin-2 (IL-2) for growth, have also been genetically altered with an IL-2 gene to allow them to grow in culture without the addition of IL-2. They have also been engineered to express a high-affinity Fc-receptor which is the main receptor for monoclonal antibodies to bind to NK-92 and use their cytotoxic load to kill cancer cells. The cells have been further engineered to express Chimeric Antigen Receptors (CARs) such as programmed death domain ligand 1 (PD-L1). During the course of development, NK-92 cells were renamed activated NK cells (aNK) and the different variants have been designated as follows:

NK-92 = parental cells, later designated aNK

NK-92ci = NK-92 cells transfected with an episomal vector for expression of IL-2

NK-92 mi = NK-92 cells transfected with an MFG vector for expression of IL-2

haNK = NK-92 (aNK) transfected with a plasmid expressing high affinity CD16 FcR and erIL-2

taNK = NK-92 (aNK) transfected with either a plasmid or lentiviral vector expressing a CAR

t-haNK = NK-92 (aNK) transfected with a plasmid expressing a CAR and CD16 FcR erIL-2

qt-haNK = NK-92 (aNK) transfected with a plasmid expressing a 4th gene in addition to a CAR, the CD16 FcR, and erIL-2: examples: homing receptor of the CXCR family or immune-active cytokines

The high affinity Fc-receptor-expressing NK (haNK) cells were administered to patients with advanced Merkel cell carcinoma (MCC) and there were some notable responses. Currently, a HER2-targeted aNK (taNK) line and various t-haNK (CAR and Fc-receptor expressing) cell lines are in clinical trials in patients with various cancers, as described in the review "The NK-92 cell line 30 years later: its impact on natural killer cell research and treatment of cancer."

== Ownership and Licenses ==
Global rights to the NK-92 cell line were assigned to ImmunityBio Inc. (formerly NantKwest, Inc.). ImmunityBio's only authorized NK-92 distributor is Brink Biologics, Inc. (San Diego), which makes NK-92 cells and certain genetically modified CD16+ variants available to third parties for non-clinical research under a limited use license agreement.
