= EMBnet =

The European Molecular Biology network (EMBnet) is an international scientific network and interest group that aims to enhance bioinformatics services by bringing together bioinformatics expertises and capacities. On 2011 EMBnet has 37 nodes spread over 32 countries. The nodes include bioinformatics related university departments, research institutes and national service providers.

== Operations ==
The main task of most EMBnet nodes is to provide their national scientific community with access to bioinformatics databanks, specialised software and sufficient computing resources and expertise. EMBnet is also working in the fields of bioinformatics training and software development. Examples of software created by EMBnet members are: EMBOSS, wEMBOSS, UTOPIA.

EMBnet represents a wide user group and works closely together with the database producers such as EMBL's European Bioinformatics Institute (EBI), the Swiss Institute of Bioinformatics (Swiss-Prot), the Munich Information Center for Protein Sequences (MIPS), in order to provide a uniform coverage of services throughout Europe. EMBnet is registered in the Netherlands as a public foundation (Stichting).

Since its creation in 1988, EMBnet has evolved from an informal network of individuals in charge of maintaining biological databases into the only worldwide organization bringing bioinformatics professionals to work together to serve the expanding fields of genetics and molecular biology. Although composed predominantly of academic nodes, EMBnet gains an important added dimension from its industrial members. The success of EMBnet is attracting increasing numbers of organizations outside Europe to join.

EMBnet has a tried-and-tested infrastructure to organise training courses, give technical help and help its members effectively interact and respond to the rapidly changing needs of biological research in a way no single institute is able to do.

In 2005 the organization created additional types of node to allow more than one member per country. The new category denomination is "associated node".

== Coordination and organization ==
EMBnet is governed by the Annual General Meetings (AGM), and is coordinated by an executive board (EB) that oversees the activities of three project committees:

- Education and Training committee (E&T). Educational support includes a series of courses organised in the member countries and languages, the committee works as well on the continued development of on-line accessible education materials.
- Publicity and Public Relations committee (P&PR). This committee is responsible for promoting any type of EMBnet activities, for the advertisement of products and services provided by the EMBnet community, as well as for proposing and developing new strategies aiming to enhance EMBnet's visibility, and to take care of public relationships with EMBnet communities and related networks/societies.
- Technical Manager committee (TM). The TM PC provides assistance and practical help to the participating nodes and their users.

== Achievements ==
EMBnet had the first gopher and World Wide Web servers in biology (CSC BioBox)

EMBnet was the first to come up with solutions for daily database updates using Internet (NDT), distributed computing (HASSLE) and efficient database browsing and linking (Sequence Retrieval System, SRS).

The Ping project was created as a means to obtain continuous information about network efficiency across the whole of Europe.

EMBnet is committed to bringing the latest software algorithms to the user free of charge (Extended GCG or EGCG) and continues to develop state of the art public software (EMBOSS).

EMBER: a European Multimedia Bioinformatics Educational Resource. EMBER was a European Union (EU) funded project aiming to develop a suite of multimedia bioinformatics educational tools . EMBER comprises a self-contained, interactive Web tutorial in bioinformatics, & the equivalent stand-alone course on CD-ROM.

The EMBnet community was involved in the creation of the peer-reviewed journal Briefings in Bioinformatics (BiB). BiB was also supported by an educational grant from EMBnet.

The Global Organisation for Bioinformatics Learning, Education and Training (GOBLET) was formed as a nonprofit foundation at the 2012 EMBnet annual meeting.

== Journal ==
EMBnet.journal
- Discipline: Bioinformatics
- Language: English
- Edited by: Erik Bongcam-Rudloff

Publication details
- History: 2010-present
- Publisher: EMBnet
- Frequency: Quarterly
- Open access: Yes

Standard abbreviations
- ISO 4: EMBnet.journal

Indexing
- ISSN: 2226-6089

Links
- Journal homepage; Online access; Online archive

Starting from 1994 and up to 2009 EMBnet published EMBnet.news. Its primary goal was to bring information and report on the latest news and developments from the network to the user community.

Established in 2010 as the successor of the EMBnet.news (with volume numbering continuing uninterrupted), EMBnet.journal is a peer-reviewed open access scientific journal publishing original research and technical papers in bioinformatics. The journal contains two main sections, one for research articles, reviews, and technical notes, and one for non-peer-reviewed commentary, reportage, user-guides, training information, and news. EMBnet.journal publishes also conference proceedings and meeting abstracts as supplements.
