= Glycodelin =

Mammalian protein found in Homo sapiens

PAEP

Identifiers
- Aliases: PAEP, GD, GdA, GdF, GdS, PAEG, PEP, PP14, progestagen associated endometrial protein, ZIF-1
- External IDs: OMIM: 173310; GeneCards: PAEP
Available structures
PDB	Human UniProt search: PDBe RCSB
PDB	List of PDB id codes 4R0B

Gene location (Human)
Chr.	Chromosome 9 (human)
Band	9q34.3	Start	135,561,756 bp
Band	9q34.3	End	135,566,955 bp
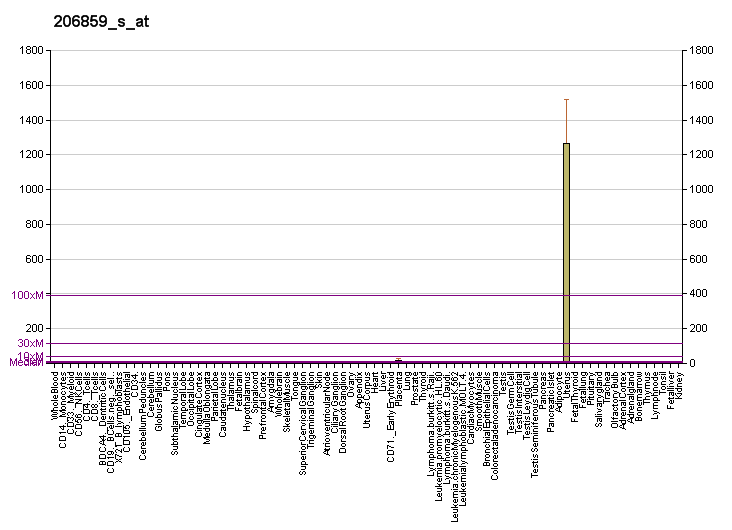
RNA expression pattern
Bgee	Human / Mouse (ortholog); Top expressed in: decidua; seminal vesicula; testicle; endometrium; gonad; right uterine tube; left uterine tube; skin of leg; skin of abdomen; appendix / n/a; More reference expression data
BioGPS	More reference expression data
Gene ontology
Molecular function	protein binding; small molecule binding
Cellular component	extracellular region
Biological process	multicellular organism development; positive regulation of granulocyte macrophage colony-stimulating factor production; apoptotic process; negative regulation of sperm capacitation; regulation of binding of sperm to zona pellucida; transport
Sources:Amigo / QuickGO
Orthologs
Databases	NCBI: entry; OMA: entry
Species	Human	Mouse
Entrez	5047	n/a
Ensembl	ENSG00000122133	n/a
UniProt	P09466	n/a
RefSeq (mRNA)	NM_001018049; NM_002571; NM_001018048	n/a
RefSeq (protein)	NP_001018058; NP_001018059; NP_002562	n/a
Location (UCSC)	Chr 9: 135.56 – 135.57 Mb	n/a
PubMed search		n/a
- Wikidata
View/Edit Human

Glycodelin (GD) also known as human placental protein-14 (PP-14), progestogen-associated endometrial protein (PAEP), or pregnancy-associated endometrial alpha-2 globulin is a secreted protein that regulates a wide range of immune function and plays an essential role in the process of implantation and gestation during pregnancy. It is glycosylated, making it a glycoprotein, and in humans is encoded by the PAEP gene. Glycodelin is known to regulate the activity of immune cell lineages including T cells, B cells, NK cells, dendritic cells, monocytes, macrophages.

Human endometrium synthesizes several proteins under the influence of progesterone. Of these proteins, glycodelin is of particular interest. It is synthesized by the endometrial glands in the luteal phase of menstrual cycle.

The temporal and spatial expression of GD in the female reproductive tract combined with its biological activities suggest that this glycoprotein probably plays an essential physiological role in the regulation of fertilization, implantation and maintenance of pregnancy.

== Gene ==
This gene is a member of the kernel lipocalin superfamily whose members share relatively low sequence similarity but have highly conserved exon-intron structure and three-dimensional protein folding. The PAEP gene is clustered on the long arm of chromosome 9 and encodes for GD protein. It is mainly expressed in 60 organs, but reaches its highest expression level in the decidua.

== Structure ==
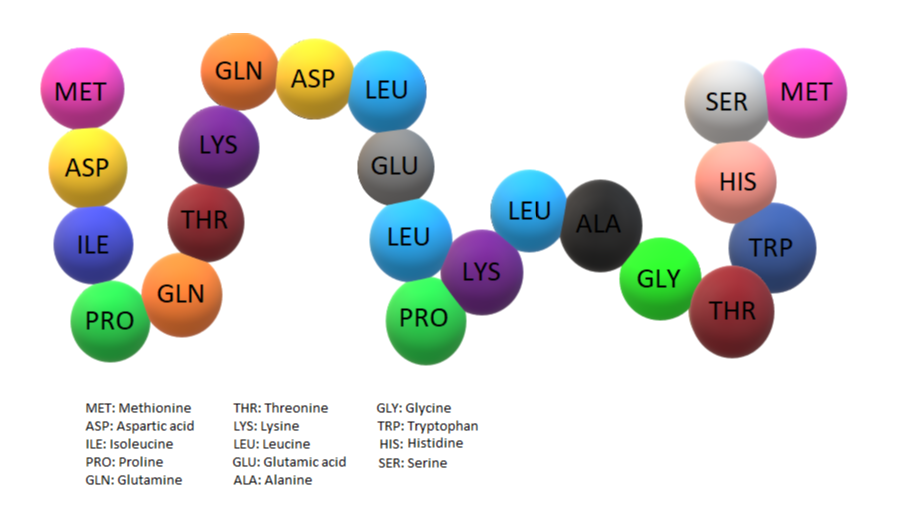
22 N-terminal amino acid sequence

Glycodelin is codified by a 180 amino acid sequence but it is thought that 18 of these are signals peptides. The molecular weight of GD is 20,555 Da, while its mature form is estimated to weigh 18,787 Da. It is encoded by a 1-kilobase-pair mRNA that is expressed in human secretory endometrium and decidua but not in postmenopausal endometrium, placenta, liver, kidney, and adrenals. The four cysteinyl residues (positions 66, 106, 119, and 160) responsible for intramolecular disulfide bridges in lactoglobulins are all conserved in GD. Southern blot analysis of human DNA suggested that GD gene sequences compass some 20 kilobase pairs of the human genomic DNA.

=== N-terminal amino acid sequence ===
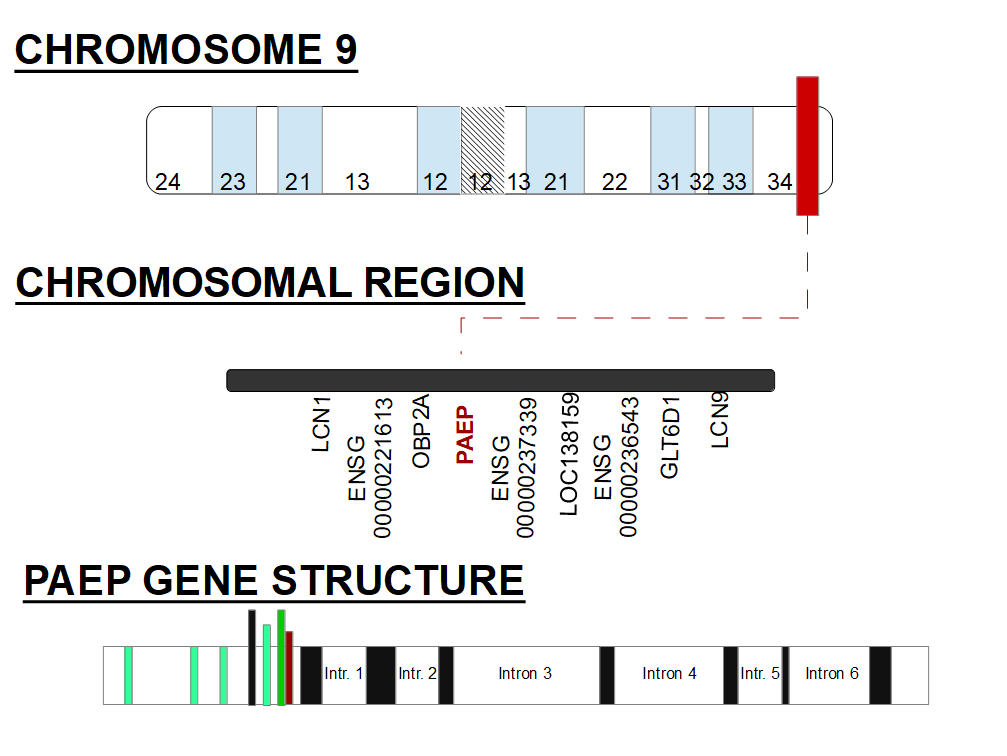
PAEP gene structure

The N-terminal amino acid sequence of glycodelin is M D I P Q T K Q D L E L P K L A G T W H S M. This sequence can be compared with horse, sheep, goat, bovine and buffalo beta-lactoglobulin. For example, there are 13 identities out of 22 possible matches with horse beta-lactoglobulin.

=== Glycosylation ===
There are four known glycoforms of human glycodelin: GdA (high terminal sialic acids and fucose), GdS (no sialic acid, high fucose and mannose), GdF (high fucose on Lewis-x/CD15 and Lewis-y antigens, higher internal N-acetylglucosamine), and GdC (unique agglutinin and lectin activity). The manner of B cell regulation exhibited by glycodelin seems to be dependent on its N-glycosylation pattern.

== Function ==
GD is the most important protein secreted in the endometrium during the mid-luteal phase of the menstrual cycle and during the first semester of pregnancy. Four distinct forms of glycoprotein, with identical protein backbones but different glycosylation profiles, are found in amniotic fluid, follicular fluid and seminal plasma of the reproductive system. These glycoproteins have distinct and essential roles in regulating a uterine environment suitable for pregnancy and in the timing and occurrence of the appropriate sequence of events in the fertilization process.

=== Glycodelin-a ===
In the female genital tract GD-A is mainly expressed in EECs (cultured endometrial epithelial cells) and secreted into the amniotic fluid, endometrium/decidua and maternal serum. Glycodelin-A has contraceptive and immunosuppressive functions, due to the fact that suppresses Natural Killer cells, achieving the prevention of the maternal rejection of the fetus at the fetromaternal interface. It has a molecular weight of 18.78 kDa determined from the cRNA sequence.

=== Glycodelin-s ===
Is secreted from seminal vesicles to the seminal fluid. A number of alternatively spliced transcript variants have been observed at this locus, but the full-length nature of only two, each encoding the same protein, has been determined. During the passage of the sperm through the cervix, glycodelin S is de-glycosylated and dissociates from the sperm, allowing the sperm to mature.

=== Glycodelin-f ===
Is secreted by granulosa cells into the follicular fluid. Glycodelin-F reduces the blinding of spermatozoa to the zona pellucida which is mainly expressed in the ovary, and synthesised in the granulosa cells, has a function in principle similar to that of Glycodelin-A. It also binds the sperm head, thereby inhibiting acrosome reaction and sperm-egg binding. Upon de-glycosilation, glycodelin F dissociates from the sperm and sperm-egg binding is possible. The de-glycosilation takes place during the passage of the sperm through the corona cell layer. Glycodelin F is thereby important to prevent a premature acrosome reaction.

=== Glycodelin-c ===
Found in Cumulus Oophorus, stimulates binding of the spermatozoa to the zona pellucida. First, cumulus cells reduce the spermatozoa-zona binding inhibitory activity of follicular fluid probably by taking up and converting glycodelin-A and glycodelin-F into glycodelin-C. Second, spermatozoa have enhanced zona bindig ability after penetrating through the cumulus oophorus. Glycodelin-C is responsible for the latter observation.

GLYCOFORM	SOURCE	GLYCOSYLATION	REPRODUCTIVE FUNCTIONS
GdA	Amniotic fluid, pregnancy decidua	High sialylation, more fucosylation	Immunoprotection for implantation and placentation, antifertilizing, inhibiting spermatozoa-zona pellucida binding
GdS	Seminal plasma, seminal vesicles	No sialylated glycans, rich in fucose and mannose	Preventing premature capacitation
GdF	Ovarian follicles, oviduct	Fucosylated Lewis-x and Lewis-y, more N-acetylglucosamine	Inhibiting spermatozoa-zona pellucida, preventing premature acrosome reaction
GdC	Cumulus oophorus, converted from GdA and GdF	Reacting with specific agglutinins in lectin-binding manner	Stimulating spermatozoa-zona pellucida binding

== Level concentrations ==
PP-14 is found in the oocyte and in the sperm. In men, the concentration of this protein in seminal plasma is higher than those in serum. In women, the levels in follicular fluid exceed those of non-pregnant women.

·Seminal plasma:

PP-14 is a significant protein constituent in most seminal plasma samples of men; sometimes comprising over 2.5% of the total protein content. The concentration of PP-14 in seminal plasma from men with oligospermia is in the reference range of this protein derived from values measured in normal men. However, vasectomized men concentrations are less than normal.

·Women's tissues and body fluids:

In serum of non-pregnant women, the concentration of PP-14 is approximately 15-40 μg/L.

In normal pregnancy:

Location (tissues and body fluids)	PP-14 concentrations (approximately)	Time
Serum	Up to 2200 μg/L (highest)	6–12 weeks
---	Decreasing concentrations	After 16 weeks
---	200 μg/L approx.	24 weeks (plateaued)
Amniotic fluid	232 mg/L (highest) (higher than those in maternal serum throughout pregnancy)	12–20 weeks
Cord blood	15-22 μg or undetectable	------------
Early pregnancy decidua	41–160 mg/g total protein	------------
Late pregnancy decidua	60-2700 μg/g total protein	------------
Amnion and chorion laeve	From 50 to 750 μg/g protein	------------
	From 50 to 1000 μg/g protein	------------
Early pregnancy placenta	0.25–15 mg/g	------------
Late pregnancy placenta	3-430 μg/g protein	------------

The concentrations of PP-14 in pregnancy serum are comparable with hCG (Human Chorionic Gonadotropin). Among all the placental proteins, the amniotic fluid PP-14 concentration is the most outstanding as decidua is a source of this protein.

== Future clinical applications ==
Placental Protein 14 has some clinical applications:

=== Biomarker of premature rupture of membranes ===
Premature rupture of membranes is a common pregnancy complication, taking into account that the current method does not satisfy the medical community, some researches have determined a new method: the analysis of placental protein in the maternal plasma and vaginal fluid. The results of these studies have shown that PP-14's concentration increased in the case of premature rupture of membranes. So this study conclude that PP-14 is an excellent biomarker with a sensibility of 100% and a specificity of 87,5%.

=== Biomarker in in vitro fertilization process ===
PP-14 is known to be a great marker to predict the outcome of in vitro fertilization and the embryo transfer cycle. Some studies have shown that the serum concentration of Placental Protein 14 was highly increased after the embryo transfer cycle, and they conclude that PP-14 might be an excellent marker to predict the endometrial receptivity.
