= Cellosaurus =

On-line knowledge resource on cell lines

Content
- Description: Cellosaurus: a knowledge resource on cell lines
- Data types captured: Cell lines
- Organisms: Vertebrate, Insect, Tick

Contact
- Research center: Swiss Institute of Bioinformatics
- Laboratory: CALIPHO
- Authors: Amos Bairoch

Access
- Data format: Flat file database, OBO and XML
- Website: www.cellosaurus.org
- Download URL: ftp://ftp.expasy.org/databases/cellosaurus
- Web service URL: API https://api.cellosaurus.org/

Tools
- Web: Search

Miscellaneous
- License: Creative Commons CC BY 4.0
- Versioning: Yes
- Data release frequency: 4 to 6 releases per year
- Curation policy: Yes - manual
- Bookmarkable entities: Yes - individual cell line entries

Cellosaurus is an online knowledge base on cell lines, which attempts to document all cell lines used in biomedical research. It is provided by the Swiss Institute of Bioinformatics (SIB). It is an ELIXIR Core Data Resource as well as an IRDiRC's Recognized Resource. It is the contributing resource for cell lines on the Resource Identification Portal. As of December 2022, it contains information for more than 144,000 cell lines.

Its scope includes immortalised cell lines, naturally immortal cell lines (example: embryonic stem cells) and finite life cell lines when those are distributed and used widely. The Cellosaurus provides a wealth of manually curated information; for each cell line it lists a recommended name, synonyms and the species of origin. Other types of information include standardised disease terminology (for cancer or genetic disorder cell lines), the transformant used to immortalise a cell line, transfected or knocked-out genes, microsatellite instability, doubling time, gender and age of donor (patient or animal), important sequence variations, web links, publication references and cross-references to close to 100 different databases, ontologies, cell collections and other relevant resources.

Since many cell lines used in research have been misidentified or contaminated, the Cellosaurus keeps track of problematic cell lines, including all those listed in the International Cell Line Authentication Committee (ICLAC) tables. For human as well as some dog cell lines, it provides short tandem repeat (STR) profile information. Since July 2018, cell lines in the Cellosaurus are represented as items in Wikidata. In March 2020, the Cellosaurus created a page containing cell line information relevant to SARS-CoV-2 in response to the COVID-19 pandemic.

The Cellosaurus encyclopedia is widely recognized as an authoritative source for cell line information, providing unique identifiers and as source of curated information.
