= Ron Appel =

Swiss academic

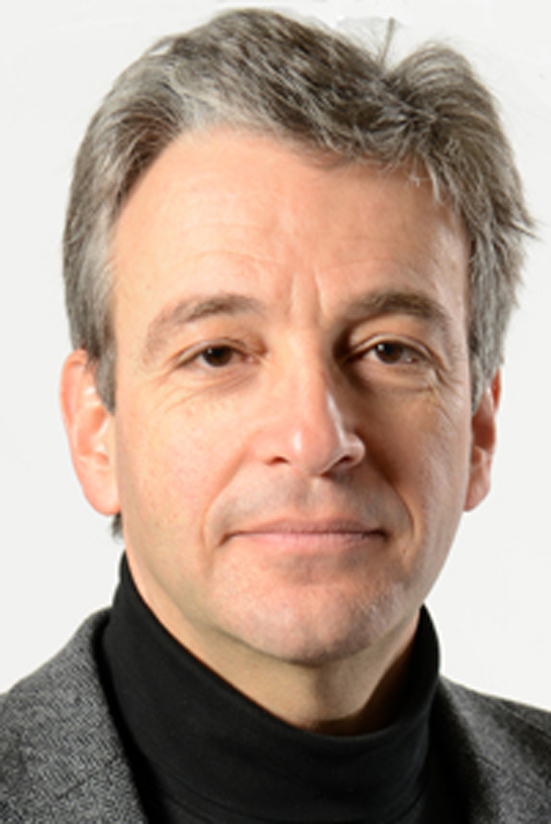
Ron Appel, executive director of the SIB Swiss Institute of Bioinformatics.

Ron David Appel (born 13 April 1959) is a Swiss bioinformatician, professor of proteomics and bioinformatics at the University of Geneva and executive director of the Swiss Institute of Bioinformatics.

== Education ==
Ron Appel graduated in computer sciences at the University of Geneva, where he also received his Ph.D. in 1987, followed by a postdoctoral fellowship at Harvard School of Public Health.

== Career ==
He was co-founder in 1998 of the SIB Swiss Institute of Bioinformatics, where he led the Proteome Informatics Group (PIG). The group developed proteomics software and databases, in particular the Melanie 2-D gel electrophoresis analysis software and the SWISS-2DPAGE database, as well as tools for the identification and characterisation of proteins using mass spectrometry. Ron Appel is also the initiator of and co-responsible for ExPASy, the world's first Web site dedicated to protein molecular biology, which has now become SIB’s main resource portal. It provides access to scientific databases and software tools in different areas of the life sciences including proteomics, genomics, transcriptomics, phylogeny, systems biology, population genetics, etc. He is also the scientific co-founder of two biotechnology companies in Geneva: one in bioinformatics - Geneva Bioinformatics (GeneBio) SA - and the other one in high-throughput proteomics - GeneProt, that ceased operations in 2005. Founding member of SIB, he is part of SIB’s Foundation Council and of the institute’s Board of Directors. He is also on the Executive Board of the Health On the Net Foundation (HON) and member of the Foundation Council of OsiriX and of the Foundation Council of the Hasler Foundation. He is co-author of three books, and 90 articles in peer-reviewed journals and has been part of several editorial boards (Proteomics).

== Awards ==
Ron received “the Man of the Year 2002” reward from the Agefi SA (Quotidien de l’Agence économique et Financière à Genève).

He also received the BioAlps Award 2014. The BioAlps Award intends to honour a personality without whom western Switzerland would not enjoy its extraordinary international reputation in the field of life sciences.
