= Swiss Academy of Medical Sciences =

Swiss medical academy founded in 1943

- Schweizerische Akademie der Medizinischen Wissenschaften
- Abbreviation: SAMW
- Formation: 24 September 1943; 83 years ago
- Type: Foundation
- Headquarters: House of Academies, Bern
- Website: www.samw.ch

The Swiss Academy of Medical Sciences (German: Schweizerische Akademie der Medizinischen Wissenschaften, SAMW; French: Académie suisse des sciences médicales, ASSM) is a Swiss foundation for the medical sciences, founded on 24 September 1943. Its work has included scientific conferences, project funding, fellowships, and ethical guidelines and recommendations for medical practice and research. Since 1984 it has received regular federal subsidies.

== History ==
The Swiss Academy of Medical Sciences was founded on 24 September 1943 as a foundation. In 1998 its seat was in Basel. Its office is now in the House of Academies (Haus der Akademien) in Bern.

As of 1998, the academy's sponsoring bodies (Träger) were the five medical faculties and the two veterinary faculties in Switzerland and the Swiss Medical Association (Verbindung der Schweizer Ärzte, Foederatio Medicorum Helveticorum, FMH). Its main aims were the promotion of research and of young researchers, support for physicians in practice, representing the medical disciplines to the outside world, and international cooperation. Its activities included scientific conferences, project funding and fellowships for clinical and scientific training, as well as drawing up ethical guidelines and recommendations for medical practice and research, for example on the determination of death, animal experiments, artificial reproduction and gene therapy.

In 1971 the academy's library and bibliographic services were expanded into the documentation service Dokdi in Bern, which closed in 2001. Especially in its early years the academy was supported by the pharmaceutical industry, which allowed it to finance important tasks. Since 1984 the federal government has paid it regular subsidies under the Research Act (Forschungsgesetz).

== Bibliography ==
- Jahresbericht. Schweizerische Akademie der Medizinischen Wissenschaften, 1944–
- A. Pletscher, "Die SAMW an der Schwelle der 90er Jahre", in Jahresbericht. Schweizerische Akademie der Medizinischen Wissenschaften, 1990, 83–95
- G. Kreis, "Wissenschaft zwischen Kooperation und Konkurrenz", in 50 Jahre Jubiläum. Schweizerische Akademie der medizinischen Wissenschaften, 1993, 9–14 (with bibliography)
- "50 Jahre Jubiläum", in Jahresbericht. Schweizerische Akademie der Medizinischen Wissenschaften, 1993, 69–107 (with bibliography)
