= Swiss Institute of Bioinformatics =

Swiss research institute

SIB Swiss Institute of Bioinformatics
- Abbreviation: SIB
- Formation: 30 March 1998; 28 years ago
- Type: academic not-for-profit foundation
- Region served: Switzerland
- Executive Director: Christophe Dessimoz
- Website: sib.swiss

The SIB Swiss Institute of Bioinformatics is an academic not-for-profit foundation dedicated to biological and biomedical data science which federates bioinformatics activities throughout Switzerland.

The institute was established on 30 March 1998 and its mission is to provide core bioinformatics resources to the national and international life sciences research community in fields such as genomics, proteomics and systems biology, as well as to lead and coordinate the field of bioinformatics in Switzerland. It promotes research, develops open databanks and software tools, is involved in teaching and service activities and in the coordination of national and international life science infrastructure projects.

It is partly funded by the Swiss government as a research infrastructure of national importance under the Federal Act on the Promotion of Research and Innovation (RIPA).

== History ==
The institute was originally created to provide a framework for stable long-term funding for both the Swiss-Prot database and the Swiss EMBnet node. Swiss-Prot in particular went through a major funding crisis in 1996, which led the leaders of the five research groups active in bioinformatics in Geneva and Lausanne, Ron Appel, Amos Bairoch, Philipp Bucher, Victor Jongeneel and Manuel Peitsch to propose the creation of SIB.

The Swiss government was at the time looking to support transdisciplinary centers of excellence in future economically important scientific fields, and provided the seed funding. Once established as a non-profit Foundation, the Institute could then apply for Federal funding: by law that support could only amount to 50% of expenses, however. The rest had to come from other sources, i.e. competitive grants and matching funds.

== Organisation ==
The SIB includes about 200 employees distributed across Switzerland (Geneva, Lausanne, Basel, Zurich), along with 700 affiliated members across most of Switzerland’s major academic institutions.

SIB’s 90 groups are active in fields as varied as environmental bioinformatics, proteomics, transcriptomics, genomics, systems biology, structural bioinformatics, evolutionary bioinformatics, modelling, imaging, biophysics, population genetics and clinical bioinformatics. SIB organizes a biannual international scientific meeting, the [BC]^{2} (Basel Computational Biology Conference).

=== Governance and funding ===
The first director of the institute was Victor Jongeneel followed by Ernest Feytmans. Ron Appel, one of its founding members, then led the institution until 2022.

SIB receives public funding to support the development of open-data databases and the long-term preservation of scientific data, especially from the Swiss State Secretariat for Education, Research and Innovation (SERI), which contributes around CHF 6.5 million per year. The development of several databases hosted by the SIB also benefited from public funding from the United States.

== Areas of activity ==
=== Bioinformatics resources ===
The Institute operates the ExPASy bioinformatics resource portal, which encompasses 160 databases and software tools developed by its teams and members. From these, SIB maintains a curated portfolio of open-access resources (known as "SIB Resources") designed to support researchers, educators, students, clinicians, and other specialists.

Among the most significant of these resources are Swiss-Prot/UniProtKB, a curated protein sequence database providing a high level of annotation, and STRING, which provides protein interaction networks and enrichment analysis. For structural biology, SWISS-MODEL offers a suite of tools and databases for protein structure homology modelling. Orthology and comparative genomics are served by both OrthoDB, a hierarchical catalogue of eukaryotic orthologs, and SwissOrthology, which incorporates the OMA (Orthologous Matrix) framework. Gene expression across animal species can be explored through Bgee, while Rhea provides a curated reference for biochemical reactions.

On the genomics and microbiology side, mOTUs enables microbial taxonomic profiling, and Nextstrain supports real-time tracking of pathogen evolution. Cellosaurus serves as a comprehensive knowledge base on cell lines, and SwissLipids provides an equivalent resource for lipid biology. The Swiss Pathogen Surveillance Platform (SPSP) supports real-time sharing of pathogen sequencing data across a One Health framework. Rounding out the portfolio, ASAP, Bgee, and V-pipe extend SIB's contributions into single-cell analysis and viral genomics respectively.

=== Bioinformatics services ===
SIB provides bioinformatics and data science services to a range of partners in both the public and private sectors. SIB’s work includes the harmonization, integration and analysis of complex biological data from various experimental technologies, as well as the development of custom software platforms and the provision of tools to support scientific workflows, such as Melanie (2D gel analysis platform). SIB engages in national and international collaborations through public-private partnerships, research grants, and innovation funding schemes such as those supported by Innosuisse. Its partners include universities, hospitals, biotechnology companies, federal authorities and pharmaceutical firms.

=== Coordination ===
The Swiss Institute of Bioinformatics (SIB) plays a coordinating and leadership role in several national and international initiatives in the field of bioinformatics and life science data infrastructure, spanning domains such as medicine, epidemic preparedness, and biodiversity. These include pan-European public-private partnerships on cancer, obesity, cardiovascular disease, etc. such as the Innovative Medicines Initiative-funded SOPHIA project or IMMUcan, focused on advancing precision oncology through immunoprofiling.

Through its Centre for Pathogen Bioinformatics, launched in 2024 and which supports epidemic preparedness through pathogen genomics and data integration, SIB coordinates the Pathogen Data Network, a global initiative funded by the U.S. National Institutes of Health (NIH), which aims to build a linked ecosystem of data and tools for epidemic response and infectious disease research.

In Switzerland, the Swiss Personalized Health Network (SPHN), a national data infrastructure making health data interoperable and shareable for research, is under the responsibility of the Swiss Academy of Medical Sciences in collaboration with SIB. The Institute also coordinates BioMedIT, a national secure IT infrastructure that facilitates the exchange and analysis of sensitive biomedical data.

SIB promotes the creation and dissemination of life science data that adhere to the FAIR principles (Findable, Accessible, Interoperable, and Reusable). SIB thus encourages open science and data stewardship to ensure that data-driven research and artificial intelligence in the life sciences are developed on ethical and transparent foundations.

=== Education and training ===
As part of its mission, SIB promotes and coordinates bioinformatics education, in collaboration with Swiss universities and as a complement to their academic teaching. SIB members are often directly, or indirectly, involved in a number of bioinformatics courses at all educational levels – from undergraduate and graduate degrees – as well as in specialized training for life scientists. SIB also promotes a PhD Training Network in bioinformatics, which is open to graduate students at Swiss schools of higher education.

=== Popular science ===
SIB is also involved in bringing bioinformatics to the layperson. Since the year 2000, in order to heighten public awareness, SIB regularly takes part in numerous science fairs, launched a mobile game in 2018 (Genome Jumper), developed interactive websites to explore the genome, precision medicine and evolution (In the Light of Evolution, winner of the Swiss National Science Foundation Optimus Agora prize in 2021). SIB also created two online magazines, Protein Spotlight and Prolune.

== See also ==
- Lausanne campus
- List of biological databases
- Science and technology in Switzerland
