= Immortalised cell line =

Lineage of cells that evades senescence and continues dividing

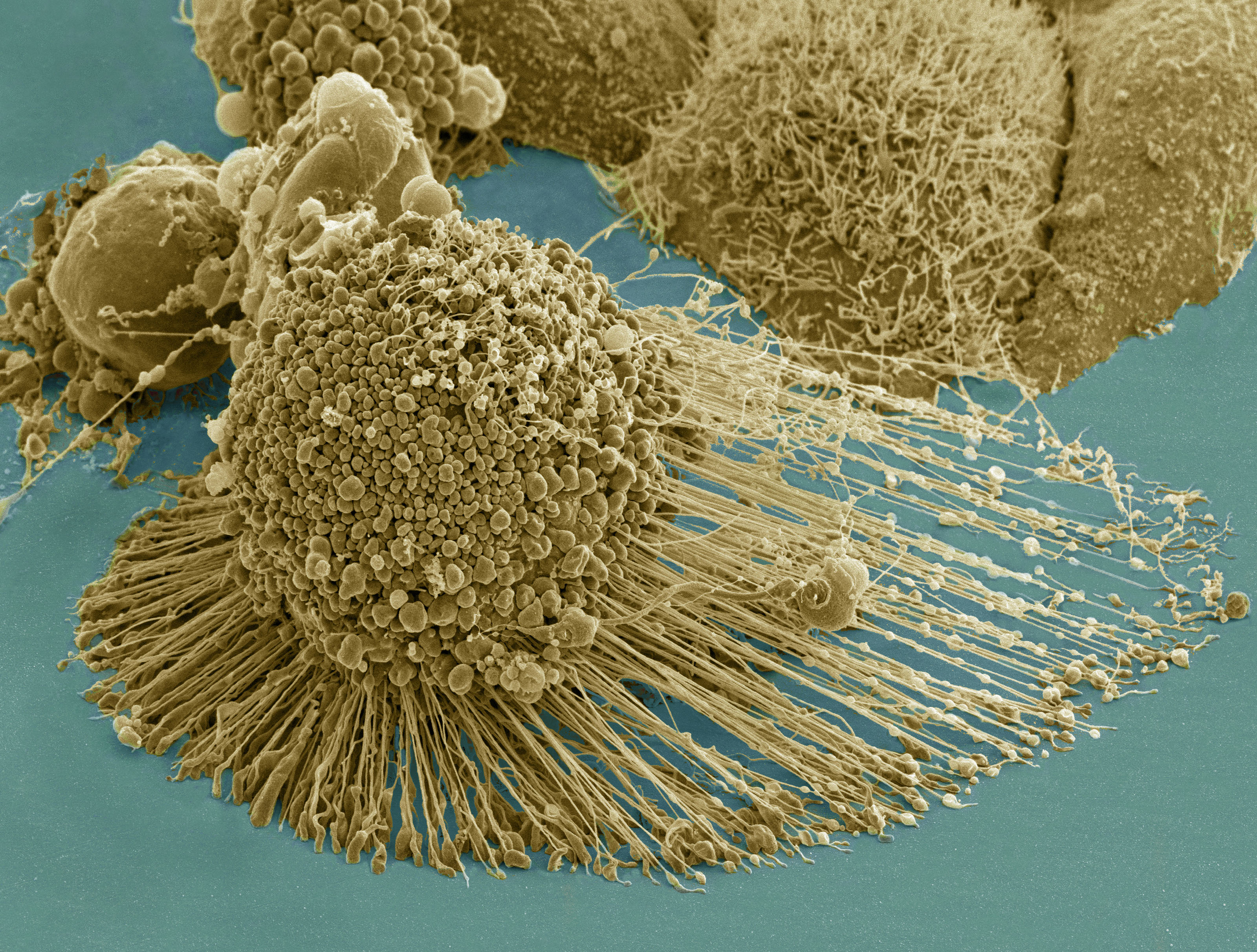
- Scanning electron micrograph of an apoptotic HeLa cell. Zeiss Merlin HR-SEM.

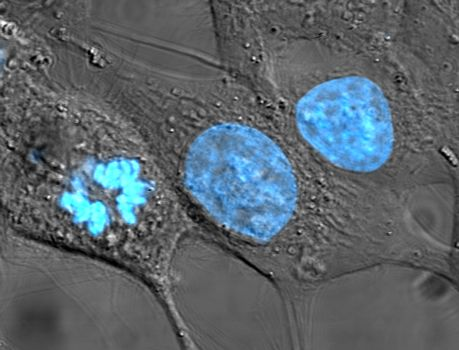
- HeLa cells, an example of an immortalised cell line. DIC image, DNA stained with Hoechst 33258.

An immortalised cell line is a population of cells from a multicellular organism that would normally not proliferate indefinitely but, due to mutation, have evaded normal cellular senescence and instead can keep undergoing division. The cells can therefore be grown for prolonged periods in vitro. The mutations required for immortality can occur naturally or be intentionally induced for experimental purposes. Immortal cell lines are a very important tool for research into the biochemistry and cell biology of multicellular organisms. Immortalised cell lines have also found uses in biotechnology.

An immortalised cell line should not be confused with stem cells, which can also divide indefinitely, but form a normal part of the development of a multicellular organism.

== Relation to natural biology and pathology ==
There are various immortal cell lines. Some of them are normal cell lines (e.g. derived from stem cells). Other immortalised cell lines are the in vitro equivalent of cancerous cells. Cancer occurs when a somatic cell that normally cannot divide undergoes mutations that cause deregulation of the normal cell cycle controls, leading to uncontrolled proliferation. Immortalised cell lines have undergone similar mutations, allowing a cell type that would normally not be able to divide to be proliferated in vitro. The origins of some immortal cell lines – for example, HeLa human cells – are from naturally occurring cancers. HeLa, the first immortal human cell line on record to be successfully isolated and proliferated by a laboratory, was taken from Henrietta Lacks in 1951 at Johns Hopkins Hospital in Baltimore, Maryland.

== Role and uses ==
Immortalised cell lines are widely used as a simple model for more complex biological systems – for example, for the analysis of the biochemistry and cell biology of mammalian (including human) cells. The main advantage of using an immortal cell line for research is its immortality; the cells can be grown indefinitely in culture. This simplifies analysis of the biology of cells that may otherwise have a limited lifetime.

Immortalised cell lines can also be cloned, giving rise to a clonal population that can, in turn, be propagated indefinitely. This allows an analysis to be repeated many times on genetically identical cells, which is desirable for repeatable scientific experiments. The alternative, performing an analysis on primary cells from multiple tissue donors, does not have this advantage.

Immortalised cell lines find use in biotechnology, where they are a cost-effective way of growing cells similar to those found in a multicellular organism in vitro. The cells are used for a wide variety of purposes, from testing toxicity of compounds or drugs to production of eukaryotic proteins.

=== Limitations ===
==== Changes from nonimmortal origins ====
While immortalised cell lines often originate from a well-known tissue type, they have undergone significant mutations to become immortal. This can alter the biology of the cell and must be taken into consideration in any analysis. Further, cell lines can change genetically over multiple passages, leading to phenotypic differences among isolates and potentially different experimental results depending on when and with what strain isolate an experiment is conducted.

==== Contamination with other cells ====
Many cell lines that are widely used for biomedical research have been contaminated and overgrown by other, more aggressive cells. For example, supposed thyroid lines were actually melanoma cells, supposed prostate tissue was actually bladder cancer, and supposed normal uterine cultures were actually breast cancer.

== Methods of generation ==
There are several methods for generating immortalised cell lines:

1. Isolation from a naturally occurring cancer. This is the original method for generating an immortalised cell line. A major example is human HeLa, a line derived from cervical cancer cells taken on February 8, 1951 from Henrietta Lacks, a 31-year-old African-American mother of five, who died of cancer on October 4, 1951.
2. Introduction of a viral gene that partially deregulates the cell cycle (e.g., the adenovirus type 5 E1 gene was used to immortalise the HEK 293 cell line; the Epstein–Barr virus can immortalise B lymphocytes by infection).
3. Artificial expression of key proteins required for immortality, for example telomerase which prevents degradation of chromosome ends during DNA replication in eukaryotes.
4. Hybridoma technology, specifically used for generating immortalised antibody-producing B cell lines, where an antibody-producing B cell is fused with a myeloma (B cell cancer) cell.

=== Examples ===
There are several examples of immortalised cell lines, each with different properties. Most immortalised cell lines are classified by the cell type they originated from or are most similar to biologically.

- 3T3 cells – a mouse fibroblast cell line derived from a spontaneous mutation in cultured mouse embryo tissue
- A549 cells – derived from a cancer patient lung tumor
- HeLa cells – a widely used human cell line isolated from cervical cancer patient Henrietta Lacks
- HEK 293 cells – derived from human fetal cells
- Huh7 cells – hepatocyte-derived carcinoma cell line
- Jurkat cells – a human T lymphocyte cell line isolated from a case of leukemia
- OK cells – derived from female North American opossum kidney cells
- Ptk2 cells – derived from male long-nosed potoroo epithelial kidney cells
- Vero cells – a monkey kidney cell line that arose by spontaneous immortalisation

== See also ==
- Cellosaurus, knowledge base of cell lines
- IGRhCellID, database of cell lines
- List of breast cancer cell lines
- Hybrid cell lines
