= Ewan Birney =

English businessman

Ewan Birney CBE FRS FMedSci
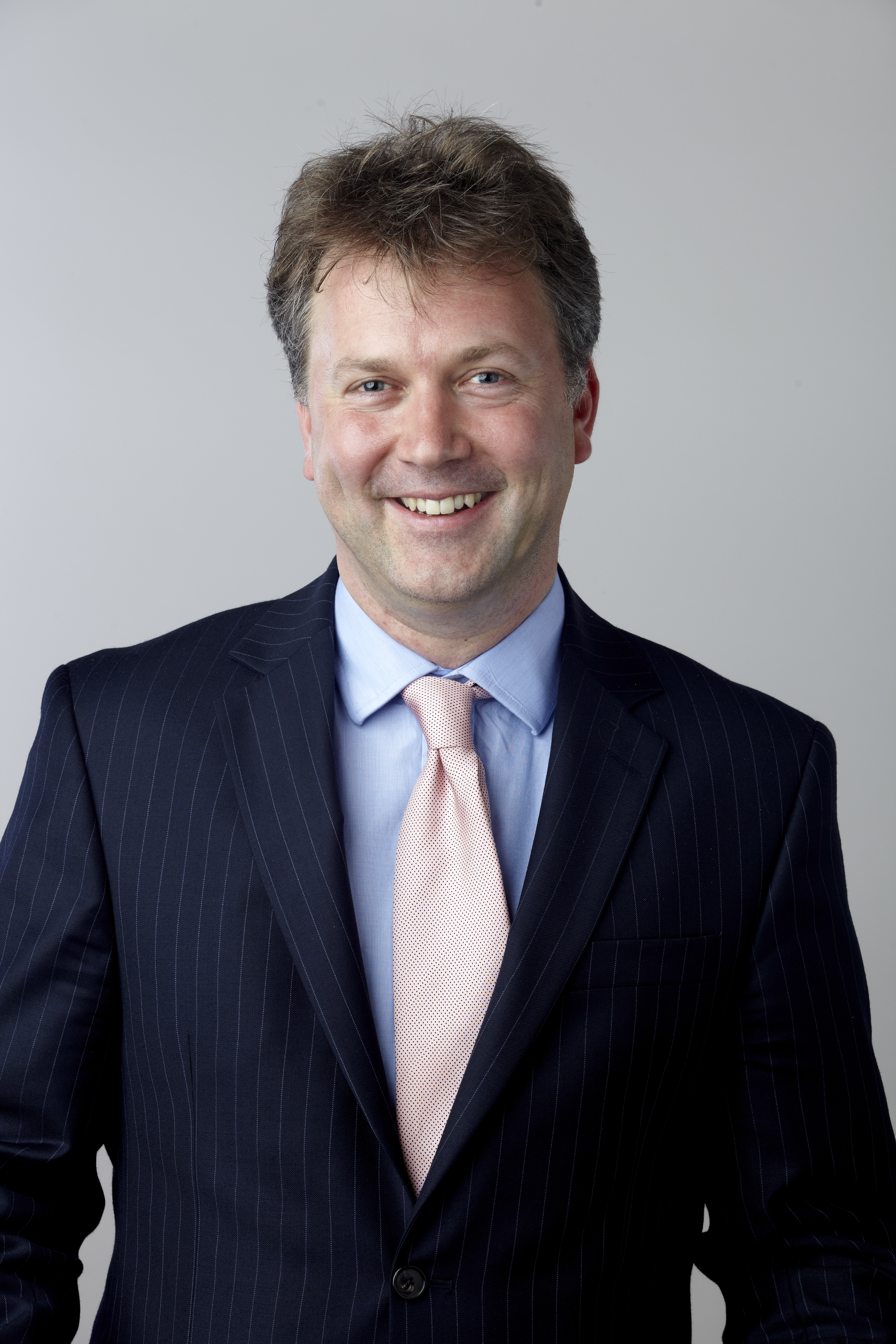
- Ewan Birney in 2014
- Born: John Frederick William Birney; 6 December 1972 (age 53); Paddington, London, England
- Other names: Ewan Birney; John Birney
- Education: Eton College; University of Oxford; University of Cambridge (PhD)
- Known for: GeneSweep; ENCODE consortium; Ensembl genome database project
- Spouse: Barley Laycock (m. 2003)
- Children: Two
- Awards: Crick Lecture (2003); Overton Prize (2005); Ben Franklin Award (2005); EMBO Member (2012)
- Scientific career
- Fields: Bioinformatics; Genomics; Computational Biology
- Institutions: University of Cambridge; European Bioinformatics Institute; European Molecular Biology Laboratory; Oxford Nanopore Technologies; Genomics England; Sanger Institute; Cold Spring Harbor Laboratory
- Thesis: Sequence alignment in bioinformatics (2000)
- Doctoral advisor: Richard Durbin
- Website: www.ebi.ac.uk/people/person/ewan-birney

John Frederick William Birney (known as Ewan Birney) (born 6 December 1972) is Director of European Bioinformatics Institute (EMBL-EBI). He also serves as non-executive director of Genomics England, chair of the Global Alliance for Genomics and Health (GA4GH) and honorary professor of bioinformatics at the University of Cambridge. Birney has made significant contributions to genomics, through his development of innovative bioinformatics and computational biology tools. He previously served as an associate faculty member at the Wellcome Trust Sanger Institute.

== Education ==
Birney was privately educated at Eton College as an Oppidan Scholar. Before going to University, Birney completed a gap year internship at Cold Spring Harbor Laboratory supervised by James Watson and Adrian Krainer.

Birney completed his Bachelor of Arts degree in Biochemistry at the University of Oxford in 1996, where he was an undergraduate student at Balliol College, Oxford. He completed his PhD at the University of Cambridge while based at the Sanger Institute, and supervised by Richard Durbin while he was a postgraduate student at St John's College, Cambridge. His doctoral research used dynamic programming, finite-state machines and probabilistic automatons for sequence alignment.

While he was a student he completed internships in the office of the Mayor of Baltimore and also in financial services on valuation of options for the Swiss Bank Corporation.

== Research and career ==
From 2000 to 2003, Birney organised a scientific wager and sweepstake known as GeneSweep, for the genomics community, taking bets on estimates of the total number of genes (and noncoding DNA) in the human genome.

Birney is one of the founders of the Ensembl genome browser and other databases, and has played a role in the sequencing of the Human Genome in 2000 and the analysis of genome function in the ENCODE project. He has played a role in annotating the genome sequences of the human, mouse, chicken and several other organisms. His research group focuses on computational genomics and inter-individual differences in human and other animals.

Birney is known for his role in the ENCODE consortium. Prior to the ENCODE project, Birney has been involved in creation of a number of widely used bioinformatics and computational biology tools, either directly (PairWise, GeneWise, GenomeWise,), or in collaboration with students and postdocs, e.g. Exonerate (with Guy Slater), Enredo (Javier Herrero), Pecan (Benedict Paten), the Velvet assembler (Daniel Zerbino ) and CRAM (Markus Hsi-Yang Fritz, Rasko Leinonen and Vadim Zalunin). Birney has also contributed to several other projects including the Pfam database, InterPro, BioPerl, and HMMER and Ensembl genome database project.

As of 2015, Birney's research group focuses on genomic algorithms and studying inter individual differences, in both human and other species. He has supervised several PhD students and postdoctoral researchers that have worked in his laboratory. His research has been funded by the Biotechnology and Biological Sciences Research Council (BBSRC), Medical Research Council (MRC) the National Human Genome Research Institute (NHGRI), the Wellcome Trust and the European Union.

Birney serves as a consultant to Oxford Nanopore Technologies and on the scientific advisory board of the Earlham Institute (formerly TGAC) in Norwich. Since 2022, he has served on the governing board at Eton College. He has also served on the boards of the Biotechnology and Biological Sciences Research Council (BBSRC), German Cancer Research Center (DKFZ), The Institute of Cancer Research (ICR), Ontario Institute for Cancer Research (OICR), Institute Pasteur and Riken institute.

=== Awards and honours ===
In 2002, Birney was named as one of the MIT Technology Review TR100 top 100 innovators in the world under the age of 35. In 2003, he gave the inaugural Francis Crick Lecture at the Royal Society: In 2005, he was awarded the Overton Prize by the International Society for Computational Biology (ISCB) for his advocacy of open source bioinformatics, contributions to the BioPerl community and leadership of the Ensembl genome annotation project. In 2005 Birney was awarded the Benjamin Franklin Award in Bioinformatics:

As expressed by his nominators, Birney has been a significant force in Open Source in Bioinformatics and science. He has been a strong advocate for making genome information freely available to all. His work co-leading the Ensembl project has made high-quality genome annotation available freely over the web, preventing a class system of labs which can and cannot afford to pay subscription fees to proprietary data. The project has worked hard to make the data available in a variety of ways to make the data accessible and easily available for mining. The Ensembl project has been open-source from the outset, enabling researchers and corporations alike to reuse and extend the software system. Birney has been an advocate of open science as well. Along with Sean Eddy, he criticised journal decisions to allow papers to be published without releasing the genome sequence data at the same time. He is also the author of the freely available Wise package of tools, which are important parts of genome annotation pipelines. He serves as a co-leader of the open-source bioinformatics toolkit Bioperl and also co-founded and currently serves as president of the Open Bioinformatics foundation, an organisation that support the development of several bioinformatics toolkits.

Birney was awarded membership of the European Molecular Biology Organization (EMBO) in 2012 and elected a Fellow of the Royal Society (FRS) in 2014. His certificate of election and candidature reads:

Ewan has grown to be a force in genomics due to his innovation in genome analysis, both algorithmic and integrative analyses. He wrote the first error tolerant, splice aware protein alignment program, used in the human and subsequent genome analysis; he co-authored one of the first and most widely used short read assemblers. In terms of data integration, Ewan has led the analysis in many genomic consortia, in particular ENCODE, leading the integration of many genomic assays; for example making robust predictions of enhancers, promoters, and their integration with disease associated regions. He also co-developed many widely used bioinformatics resources.

Birney has been awarded an Honorary Doctor of Science (DSc) degrees: in 2014 from Brunel University London and in 2021 from University of Tartu, Estonia. In 2015, Birney was elected a Fellow of the Academy of Medical Sciences (FMedSci). Birney was appointed Commander of the Order of the British Empire (CBE) in the 2019 New Year Honours.

== Personal life ==
Birney married in 2003 and has two children.

Academic offices
Preceded by Janet Thornton	Director of the European Bioinformatics Institute; 2015–present	Incumbent
