= Oligotyping =

In molecular biology, the term oligotyping may refer to multiple DNA sequence analysis methods.

- Oligotyping (taxonomy) may refer to a method of identifying organism taxonomy by primary DNA sequence
- Oligotyping (sequencing) may refer to a method of improving the accuracy of DNA sequencing
