= Hunter Fraser =

American professor of biology at Stanford University

Hunter B. Fraser
- Known for: Evolutionary genomics; CRISPEY technology; evolution of gene expression
- Title: Professor of Biology

Academic background
- Education: Massachusetts Institute of Technology (B.S.); University of California, Berkeley (Ph.D.)
- Doctoral advisor: Michael Eisen

Hunter B. Fraser is a Professor of Biology at Stanford University, where he leads a research laboratory focused on evolutionary genomics and quantitative genetics. He is a member of Stanford Bio-X, Stanford's interdisciplinary biosciences institute, the Maternal & Child Health Research Institute (MCHRI), the Stanford Cancer Institute, and the Wu Tsai Neurosciences Institute. His research focuses on developing new experimental and computational methods to study the evolution of gene expression and complex traits.

== Early life and education ==
Fraser completed his undergraduate degree in Biology at the Massachusetts Institute of Technology. As an undergraduate, he participated in the Santa Fe Institute's Undergraduate Complexity Research (UCR) program in 1999, where he received his first introduction to computational biology. He has credited this experience as a turning point that redirected his focus from purely experimental biology to computational approaches to studying evolution.

Fraser completed his Ph.D. in Molecular and Cellular Biology at the University of California, Berkeley in 2005, under the supervision of Michael Eisen.

== Career ==
Following his doctorate, Fraser undertook postdoctoral research at Stanford University, working on the relationship between genetic variation and gene regulation across species. During this period, he was supported by the Merck/MIT Computational Systems Biology Initiative Postdoctoral Fellowship (2006) and the Life Science Research Foundation Postdoctoral Fellowship (2007).

He subsequently worked at Rosetta Inpharmatics in Seattle, Washington, collaborating with Eric Schadt to investigate how genetic variation shapes gene expression in model organisms, including mice and yeast. Fraser then joined the Stanford faculty as a professor in the Department of Biology, where he was promoted to full Professor in March 2022.

== Research ==
Fraser's lab studies the evolution of complex traits by developing new experimental and computational methods. The lab's work integrates quantitative genetics, genomics, epigenetics, and evolutionary biology to understand how genetic variation shapes the phenotypic diversity of life. His long-term goal is to understand the genetic basis of complex traits well enough to introduce them into new species via genome editing.

=== Evolution of gene expression ===
A central focus of the Fraser lab is the evolution of gene expression, which Fraser views as the primary driver of adaptive change. By studying cis-regulatory divergence changes in the non-coding sequences that control when, where, and how much a gene is expressed his lab aims to identify the molecular mechanisms underlying polygenic adaptations. The lab uses interspecies hybrids to map the landscape of cis-regulatory divergence more efficiently than traditional quantitative trait locus (QTL) mapping approaches.

Model organisms used by the lab span a broad evolutionary range, including yeast (Saccharomyces cerevisiae), Drosophila species, primates, sticklebacks, and cichlids, enabling comparative analyses across widely diverged lineages.

=== CRISPEY technology ===
Fraser's lab developed CRISPEY (Cas9 Retron Precise Parallel Editing via homology), a CRISPR-based technology that enables genome editing that is both high-throughput and precise, overcoming the previous restriction of high-throughput CRISPR screens to random mutagenesis. CRISPEY has been applied to measure the fitness effects of thousands of natural genetic variants at single-base resolution, to study interactions among genetic variants (epistasis) and between variants and the environment (gene-by-environment interactions, or GxE), and to map fitness landscapes with unprecedented resolution.

An extension of this technology, CRISPEY-BAR (BARcoded Cas9 Retron Precise Parallel Editing via homology), was subsequently developed to map gene-by-environment (GxE) interactions of naturally occurring genetic polymorphisms at single-nucleotide resolution.

=== Epigenetics and DNA methylation ===
The lab has made significant contributions to mapping genetic variants associated with DNA methylation, an epigenetic modification that plays a key role in gene regulation. Fraser developed a novel pooling-based approach to map methylation quantitative trait loci (meQTLs) at genome-wide scale with allele-specific resolution, a major improvement over prior microarray-based methods limited to less than two percent of the genome.

=== Human evolution and primate genomics ===
The Fraser lab has used cell fusion techniques to study the cis-regulatory differences between humans and other primates. A notable study published in Nature Genetics used human–chimpanzee fused cells to reveal cis-regulatory divergence underlying skeletal differences between the two species. A parallel study used primate cell fusions to disentangle gene regulatory divergence in neurodevelopment.

=== Natural selection and adaptive evolution ===
An influential early contribution from Fraser's lab introduced a statistical test for detecting lineage-specific selection on gene expression, and applied it to genome-wide yeast expression data to show that hundreds of gene expression levels had been subject to lineage-specific selection.

== Teaching ==
At Stanford, Fraser teaches the course The Science and Ethics of Personalized Genomic Medicine (BIO 4N), offered in the Winter quarter.

== Selected publications ==
- Hirsh, Aaron E.; Fraser, Hunter B. (2001). "Protein dispensability and rate of evolution". Nature. 411 (6841): 1046–1049. doi:10.1038/35082561. ISSN 0028-0836.
- Fraser, Hunter B.; Hirsh, Aaron E.; Steinmetz, Lars M.; Scharfe, Curt; Feldman, Marcus W. (2002). "Evolutionary rate in the protein interaction network". Science. 296 (5568): 750–752. doi:10.1126/science.1068696.
- Fraser, Hunter B; Hirsh, Aaron E; Giaever, Guri; Kumm, Jochen; Eisen, Michael B (2004-04-27). "Noise Minimization in Eukaryotic Gene Expression". PLoS Biology. 2 (6) e137. doi:10.1371/journal.pbio.0020137. ISSN 1545-7885. PMC 400249. PMID 15124029.
- Fraser, Hunter B. (2005). "Modularity and evolutionary constraint on proteins". Nature Genetics. 37: 351–352. doi:10.1038/ng1530.
- Fraser, Hunter B.; Moses, Alan M.; Schadt, Eric E. (2010). "Evidence for widespread adaptive evolution of gene expression in budding yeast". Proceedings of the National Academy of Sciences. 107 (7): 2997–3002. doi:10.1073/pnas.0912245107. PMC 2840270.
- Lam, Lucia L.; Emberly, Eldon; Fraser, Hunter B.; Neumann, Sarah M.; Chen, Edith; Miller, Gregory E.; Kobor, Michael S. (2012-10-16). "Factors underlying variable DNA methylation in a human community cohort". Proceedings of the National Academy of Sciences. 109 (supplement_2): 17253–17260. doi:10.1073/pnas.1121249109. ISSN 0027-8424. PMC 3477380. PMID 23045638.
- Kaplow, Irene M.; MacIsaac, Julia L.; Fraser, Hunter B. (2015). "A pooling-based approach to mapping genetic variants associated with DNA methylation". Genome Research. 25 (6): 907–917. doi:10.1101/gr.183749.114. PMC 4448686.
- Tehranchi, Ashley K.; Myrthil, Mariana; Fraser, Hunter B. (2016). "Pooled ChIP-Seq Links Variation in Transcription Factor Binding to Complex Disease Risk". Cell. 165 (3): 730–741. doi:10.1016/j.cell.2016.03.041. PMC 4842172.
- Sharon, Eilon; Chen, Shao-Ahn; Fraser, Hunter B. (2018). "Functional Genetic Variants Revealed by Massively Parallel Precise Genome Editing". Cell. 175 (2): 544–557. doi:10.1016/j.cell.2018.08.057. PMC 6563827.
- Gokhman, David; Fraser, Hunter B. (2021). "Human–chimpanzee fused cells reveal cis-regulatory divergence underlying skeletal evolution". Nature Genetics. 53 (4): 467–476. doi:10.1038/s41588-021-00804-3. PMC 8038968.
- Agoglia, Rachel M.; Fraser, Hunter B. (2021). "Primate cell fusion disentangles gene regulatory divergence in neurodevelopment". Nature. 592: 421–427. doi:10.1038/s41586-021-03343-3. PMC 8719633.

== Personal life ==
On June 7, 2023, Fraser was reported missing while backpacking in Olympic National Park. The search was called off upon learning that Fraser had self-rescued and walked out of the park via the Dosewallips River Trail on June 10, 2023.
