= Richard Durbin =

Richard Durbin may refer to:

- Dick Durbin (Richard Joseph Durbin, born 1944), United States Senator from the state of Illinois
- Richard M. Durbin (born 1960), computational biologist and Fellow of the Royal Society
