= A. Murat Eren =

Computer scientist

A. Murat Eren (Meren)
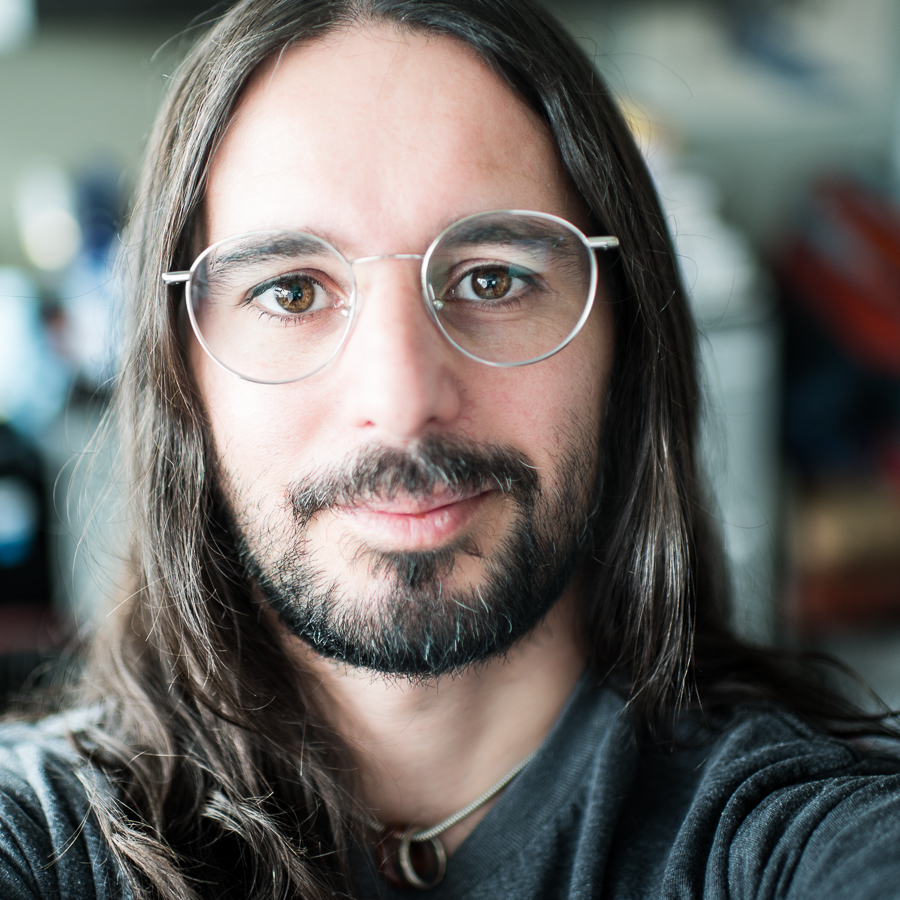
- Born: 1980 (age 45–46)
- Education: University of New Orleans
- Scientific career
- Fields: Microbial ecology, Bioinformatics
- Workplaces: Marine Biological Laboratory, and University of Chicago.
- Thesis: Assessing Microbial Diversity Through Nucleotide Variation (2011)
- Doctoral advisor: Michael Ferris
- Other academic advisors: Mitchell Sogin
- Website: https://meren.org

A. Murat Eren (Meren) is a computer scientist known for his work on microbial ecology and developing novel, open-source, computational tools for analysis of large data sets.

== Early life and education ==
Eren grew up in the Barhal Valley in Turkey and studied cryptography as an undergraduate at Canakkale Onsekiz Mart Universitesi where he earned a B.S. in 2002. He moved to the United States and started his Ph.D. at the University of New Orleans. While working at the Children's Hospital of New Orleans, Eren was introduced to microbiology by Michael Ferris. In 2011 Eren completed his Ph.D.; his dissertation was titled Assessing microbial diversity through nucleotide variation.

== Career and research ==
Eren's Ph.D. research involved developing oligotyping, a computational method to examine the diversity of microorganisms within high throughput sequencing datasets. Following his Ph.D., Eren joined the Marine Biological Laboratory as a postdoctoral scientist, during which he applied oligotyping to microbes that live in the human genitourinary tract, oral cavity, and sewage. In 2015 he joined the University of Chicago as an assistant professor, where he started using metagenomics to investigate the ecology and evolution of microbes found in the human gut, human mouth, and surface ocean. In 2022, Eren was appointed Professor of Ecosystem Data Science at the University of Oldenburg and the Alfred Wegener Institute for Polar and Marine Research.

Eren is an advocate of open-source software and leads the community development of anvi'o, a platform to allow analysis and visualization of large datasets.

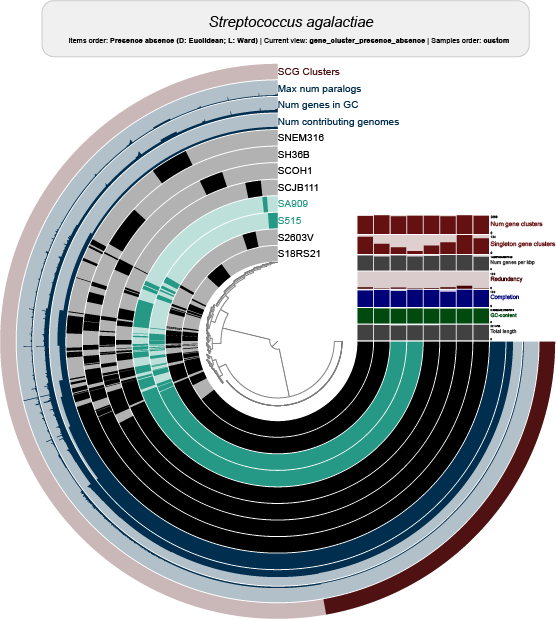
Example of Anvi'o software output

== Selected publications ==
- Eren, A. Murat; Esen, Özcan C.; Quince, Christopher; Vineis, Joseph H.; Morrison, Hilary G.; Sogin, Mitchell L.; Delmont, Tom O. (8 October 2015). "Anvi'o: an advanced analysis and visualization platform for 'omics data". PeerJ. 3 e1319. doi:10.7717/peerj.1319. ISSN 2167-8359. PMC 4614810. PMID 26500826.
- Eren, A. Murat; Maignien, Loïs; Sul, Woo Jun; Murphy, Leslie G.; Grim, Sharon L.; Morrison, Hilary G.; Sogin, Mitchell L. (2013). "Oligotyping: differentiating between closely related microbial taxa using 16S rRNA gene data". Methods in Ecology and Evolution. 4 (12): 1111–1119. Bibcode:2013MEcEv...4.1111E. doi:10.1111/2041-210X.12114. hdl:1912/6377. ISSN 2041-210X. PMC 3864673. PMID 24358444.
- Eren, A. Murat; Zozaya, Marcela; Taylor, Christopher M.; Dowd, Scot E.; Martin, David H.; Ferris, Michael J. (25 October 2011). "Exploring the Diversity of Gardnerella vaginalis in the Genitourinary Tract Microbiota of Monogamous Couples Through Subtle Nucleotide Variation". PLOS ONE. 6 (10) e26732. Bibcode:2011PLoSO...626732E. doi:10.1371/journal.pone.0026732. ISSN 1932-6203. PMC 3201972. PMID 22046340.
- Eren, A. Murat; Morrison, Hilary G.; Lescault, Pamela J.; Reveillaud, Julie; Vineis, Joseph H.; Sogin, Mitchell L. (April 2015). "Minimum entropy decomposition: Unsupervised oligotyping for sensitive partitioning of high-throughput marker gene sequences". The ISME Journal. 9 (4): 968–979. Bibcode:2015ISMEJ...9..968E. doi:10.1038/ismej.2014.195. ISSN 1751-7370. PMC 4817710. PMID 25325381.

== Awards and honors ==
- Alfred P. Sloan Foundation Research Fellowship in Ocean Sciences (2020)
- American Society for Microbiology Award for Early Career Environmental Research (2021)
- Research Parasite Award Sustained Parasitism (2022)
