= Benjamin Franklin Medal =

Benjamin Franklin Medal may refer to:

- Benjamin Franklin Medal (American Philosophical Society)
- Benjamin Franklin Medal (Franklin Institute)
- Benjamin Franklin Medal (Royal Society of Arts)
- Benjamin Franklin Award (Bioinformatics)

== See also ==
- Franklin Medal, awarded by the Franklin Institute 1915–1997
- IBPA Benjamin Franklin Awards, of the Independent Book Publishers Association
