= AceDB =

Database for handling genomic data

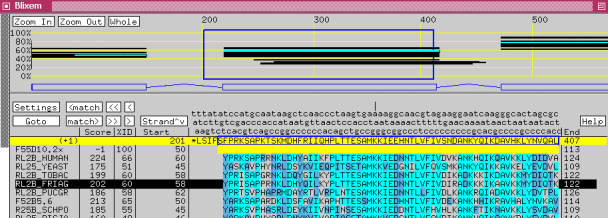
AceDB Multiple Sequence Alignment View

AceDB is a biological database for handling genomic data. It was developed by Richard M. Durbin and Jean Thierry-Mieg in 1989. AceDB stands for a C. elegans database. Although AceDB was initially created as a database specifically for the nematode worm it has also come to mean the database software itself, which has been used to store information for other species. According to its website, AceDB provides a custom database kernel with a non-standard data model designed with flexibility in mind. For example, there is an AceDB instance for the organism Pristionchus pacificus called AppaDB. Much of the functionality of AceDB for C. elegans has been made available through the WormBase database.

Features included:

- a graphical user interface with many specific displays and tools for genomic data
- open-source software
- package that implements a simple web browser interface allowing the database to accessed from anywhere
- Interfaces easily with perl, Java and CORBA
- Tools for comparative genome analysis including The Oxford Grid, The Pairwise Chromosome Map, The One-to-Many Chromosome Map, The Species Grid, Translocation Grid
- built-in ability to handle phylogenetic data
- easily links to outside applications
- developed to run under the Unix operating system, using X-Windows for graphics, with a local copy of the database files

Development on AceDB appears to have ceased as the interface is still using old technology and many of the sites that originally used it have upgraded to newer software.
