= Scientific wager =

Bet on the outcome of a scientific question

A scientific wager is a wager whose outcome is settled by experiment or observation, following the scientific method. It typically comprises a commitment to pay out when a currently-unknown or uncertain statement is resolved, and either proven or disproved. Some wagers have specific date restrictions for collection, but many are open. Wagers occasionally exert a powerful galvanizing effect on society and the scientific community.

Notable scientists who have made scientific wagers include Stephen Hawking and Richard Feynman. The Stanford Linear Accelerator has an open book containing about 35 wagers in particle physics dating back to 1980; many are still unresolved.

== Notable scientific wagers ==
There are many examples of scientific wagers from the past two centuries, many related to large-scale questions in science at the time.

In 1870, Alfred Russel Wallace bet a flat-Earth theorist named John Hampden that he could prove the flat Earth hypothesis incorrect. The sum staked was £500 (equivalent to £62,000 in 2024). A test involving a stretch of the Old Bedford River, in Norfolk, was agreed on: Wallace measured the curvature of the canal's surface using two markers separated by about 5 km (3 mi) and suspended at equal heights above the water's surface. Using a telescope mounted 5 km from one of the markers, Wallace established that the nearer one appeared to be the higher of the two. An independent referee agreed that this showed the Earth's surface to curve away from the telescope, and so Wallace won his money. However, Hampden never accepted the result and made increasingly unpleasant threats to Wallace. This test is now known as the Bedford Level experiment.

In 1975, cosmologist Stephen Hawking bet fellow cosmologist Kip Thorne a subscription to Penthouse for Thorne against four years of Private Eye for him that Cygnus X-1 would turn out to not be a black hole. In 1990, Hawking acknowledged that he had lost the bet. Hawking's explanation for his position was that if black holes did not actually exist much of his research would be incorrect, but at least he would have the consolation of winning the bet.

In 1975, Michael Sipser wagered an ounce of gold with Leonard Adleman that the P versus NP problem would be solved with a proof that P≠NP by the end of the 20th century. Sipser sent Adleman an American Gold Eagle coin in 2000 because the problem remained (and remains) unsolved.

In 1978, chess International Master David Levy won £1250 (equivalent to £7,800 in 2024) from four artificial intelligence experts by never losing a match to a chess program in a ten-year span from 1968 to 1978.

In 1980, biologist Paul R. Ehrlich bet economist Julian Lincoln Simon that the price of a portfolio of US$200 (equivalent to $800 in 2025) of each of five mineral commodities (copper, chromium, nickel, tin, and tungsten) would rise over the next 10 years. He lost, and paid the amount the total price had declined: $576.07 (equivalent to $1,400 in 2025). See: Simon–Ehrlich wager

In 1997, Stephen Hawking and Kip Thorne made a bet with John Preskill on the ultimate resolution of the apparent contradiction between Hawking radiation resulting in a loss of information, and a requirement of quantum mechanics that information cannot be destroyed. Hawking and Thorne bet that information must be lost in a black hole; Preskill bet that it must not. The formal wager was: "When an initial pure quantum state undergoes gravitational collapse to form a black hole, the final state at the end of black hole evaporation will always be a pure quantum state". The stake was an encyclopaedia of the winner's choice, from which "information can be recovered at will". Hawking conceded the bet in 2004, giving a baseball encyclopaedia to John Preskill. Thorne has not formally conceded. See: Thorne-Hawking-Preskill bet

In 2000 roughly 40 physicists made a bet about the existence of supersymmetry, to be settled in 2011, but because the Large Hadron Collider was delayed the bet was extended to 2016. As of summer 2016 there had been no signs of superparticles, and the losers delivered "good cognac at a price not less than $100" each to the winners (equivalent to $130 in 2025).

In 2000, Steven Austad and Jay Olshansky bet US$150 (equivalent to $280 in 2025) each on whether anyone born before 2001 will reach the age of 150. They later increased the bet to $300 (equivalent to $400 in 2025) each. The pot is invested in a fund, and could be worth several hundred million dollars by 2150.

From 2000 to 2003, scientists placed bets on the number of genes in the human genome in a sweepstakes known as GeneSweep organised by Ewan Birney.

In 2005, British climate scientist James Annan laid bets with global warming denialists concerning whether future temperatures will increase. Two Russian solar physicists, Galina Mashnich and Vladimir Bashkirtsev, accepted the wager of US$10,000 (equivalent to $15,000 in 2024) that the average global temperature during 2012–2017 would be lower than during 1998–2003. The bet ended in 2017 with a win to Annan. Mashnich and Bashkirtsev did not honour the bet. Previously, Annan had directly challenged Richard Lindzen. Lindzen had been willing to bet that global temperatures would drop over the next 20 years. Annan says that Lindzen wanted odds of 50–1 against falling temperatures. Lindzen, however, says that he asked for 2–1 odds against a temperature rise of over 0.4 °C. Annan and others state they have challenged other denialists to bets over global warming that were not accepted, including Annan's attempt in 2005 to accept a bet that had been offered by Patrick Michaels in 1998 that temperatures would be cooler after ten years. Annan made a bet in 2011 with astrophysicist David Whitehouse that the Met Office temperature would set a new annual record by the end of the year. Annan was declared to have lost on January 13, 2012.

In 2005, The Guardian columnist George Monbiot challenged Myron Ebell of the Competitive Enterprise Institute to a £5,000 bet (equivalent to £8,000 in 2024) of global warming versus global cooling.

On July 8, 2009, at a FQXi conference in the Azores, Antony Garrett Lisi made a public bet with Frank Wilczek that superparticles would not be detected by July 8, 2015. On August 16, 2016, after agreeing to a one-year delay to allow for more data collection from the Large Hadron Collider, Frank Wilczek conceded the superparticle bet to Lisi.

In 2012, Stephen Hawking lost $100 (equivalent to $140 in 2025) to Gordon Kane of the University of Michigan because of the Higgs boson discovery.

Zvi Bern has won many bets connected to quantum gravity. In 2016 David Gross lost a wager about supersymmetry, but he continues to believe in the theory. In 2017, Daniel J. Bernstein made a bet for US$2,048 (equivalent to $2,600 in 2024) with Francisco Rodríguez-Henríquez that quantum computers will publicly break the RSA-2048 factoring challenge no later than 2033. In 2023, John Preuß Mattsson bet $2,050 that the challenge will withstand quantum computing until at least 2050. Daniel J. Bernstein, John Sahhar, Daniel Apon, and Michele Mosca accepted the bet.

In 2021 Alexander Kusenko lost a $10,000 wager to Derek Muller over the possibility of sailing directly downwind faster than the wind as documented on Muller's channel, Veritasium.

== See also ==
- Long Now Foundation § Long Bet Project
- The efforts of photographer Eadweard Muybridge to capture the motion of a galloping horse were not part of a wager, contrary to popular opinion.
- Pascal's wager is not a wager in the sense used in this article.
