= Pacific Symposium on Biocomputing =

Annual scientific meeting

- Frequency: Annually
- Locations: Hawaii, United States
- Years active: 30
- Previous event: PSB 2025
- Next event: PSB 2026
- Organiser: Tiffany Murray (2015 coordinator)
- Website: psb.stanford.edu

The Pacific Symposium on Biocomputing (PSB) is an annual multidisciplinary scientific meeting co-founded in 1996 by Dr. Teri Klein, Dr. Lawrence Hunter and Sharon Surles. The conference is to present and discuss research in the theory and application of computational methods for biology. Papers and presentations are peer reviewed and published. PSB brings together researchers from the US and the Asian Pacific nations, to exchange research results and address open issues in all aspects of computational biology. PSB is a forum for the presentation of work in databases, algorithms, interfaces, visualization, modeling, and other computational methods, as applied to biological problems, with emphasis on applications in data-rich areas of molecular biology.

The PSB aims for "critical mass" in sub-disciplines within biocomputing. For that reason, it is the only meeting whose sessions are defined dynamically each year in response to specific proposals. PSB sessions are organized by leaders in the emerging areas and targeted to provide a forum for publication and discussion of research in biocomputing's topics.

Since 2017 the Research Parasite Award has been announced and presented annually at the Symposium to recognize scientists who study previously published data in ways not anticipated by the researchers who first generated it. Since the 2019 award year, the Research Parasite Award has been supported in part by an endowment housed at the University of Pennsylvania. Research Symbiont Award is another award presented annually at the Symposium to recognize exemplars in the practice of data sharing.
