= PRINTS =

Biological database of proteins

In molecular biology, the PRINTS database was a collection of so-called "fingerprints": it provided both a detailed annotation resource for protein families, and a diagnostic tool for newly determined sequences. A fingerprint is a group of conserved motifs taken from a multiple sequence alignment - together, the motifs form a characteristic signature for the aligned protein family. The motifs themselves are not necessarily contiguous in sequence, but may come together in 3D space to define molecular binding sites or interaction surfaces. The particular diagnostic strength of fingerprints lies in their ability to distinguish sequence differences at the clan, superfamily, family and subfamily levels. This allows fine-grained functional diagnoses of uncharacterised sequences, allowing, for example, discrimination between family members on the basis of the ligands they bind or the proteins with which they interact, and highlighting potential oligomerisation or allosteric sites.

PRINTS was previously hosted at the University of Manchester Bioinformatics Education and Research, but has been retired and InterPro serves as an archive for it.
