= Richard M. Durbin =

British computational biologist

Richard Durbin FRS
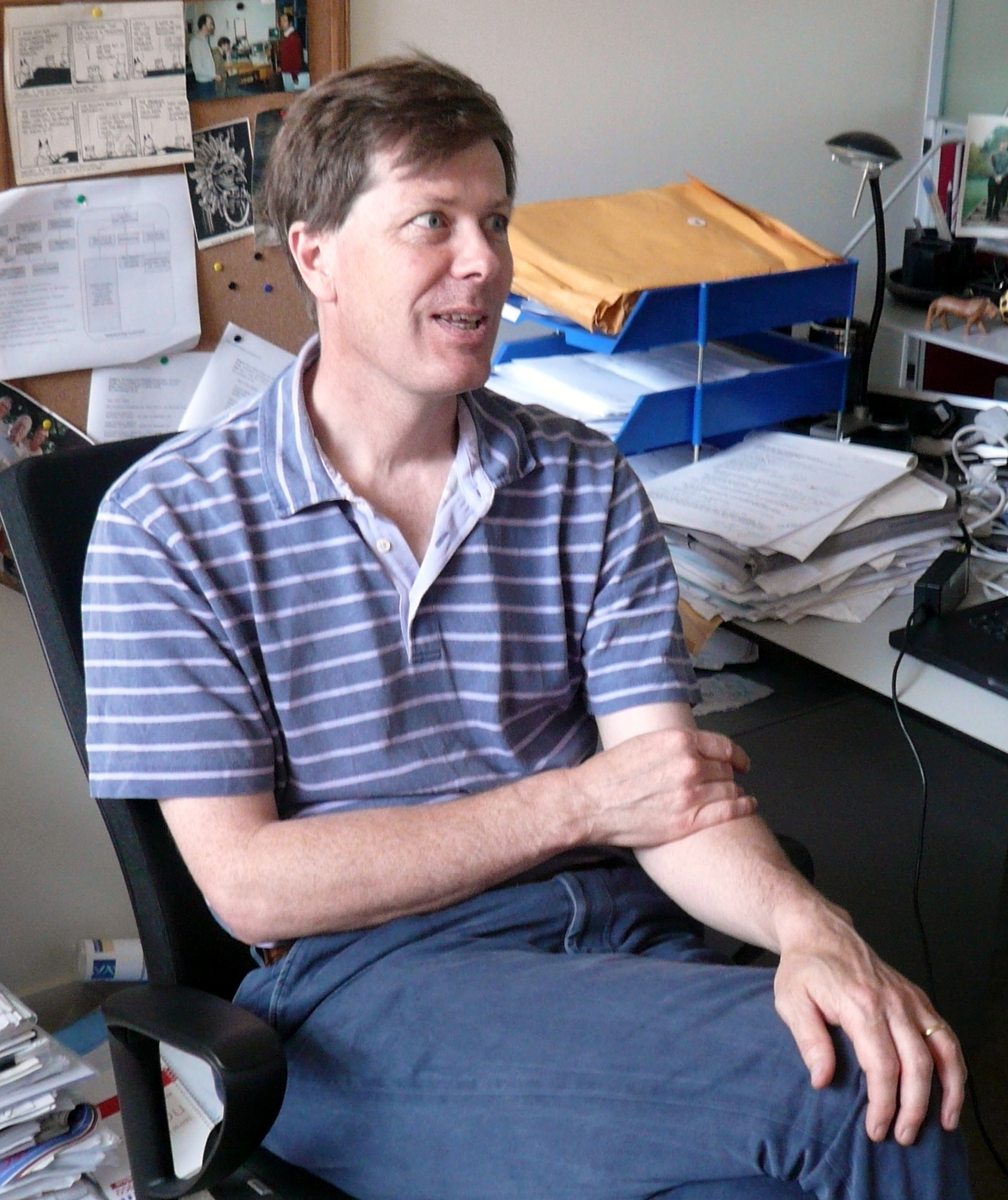
- Durbin in 2008
- Born: Richard Michael Durbin; 30 December 1960 (age 65)
- Education: Highgate School; St John's College, Cambridge (BA, PhD)
- Known for: Biological Sequence Analysis
- Spouse: Julie Ahringer (m. 1996)
- Awards: Mullard Award (1994); EMBO Member (2009); Gabor Medal (2017)
- Scientific career
- Fields: Genomics; Bioinformatics; Human genetics; Computational biology; Genome evolution
- Workplaces: University of Cambridge; Laboratory of Molecular Biology; Stanford University; Wellcome Trust Sanger Institute; King's College, Cambridge
- Thesis: Studies on the development and organisation of the nervous system of Caenorhabditis elegans (1987)
- Doctoral advisor: John G. White
- Doctoral students: Ewan Birney
- Other notable students: Sean Eddy; Heng Li; Alex Bateman; (postdocs)
- Website: www.gen.cam.ac.uk/directory/richard-durbin

Richard Michael Durbin FRS (born 1960) is a British computational biologist and Al-Kindi Professor of Genetics at the University of Cambridge. He also serves as an associate faculty member at the Wellcome Sanger Institute where he was previously a senior group leader.

== Education ==
Durbin was educated at The Hall School, Hampstead and Highgate School in London. After competing in the 1978/9 International Mathematical Olympiad, he went on to study at the University of Cambridge graduating in 1982 with a second class honours degree in the Cambridge Mathematical Tripos. After graduating, he continued to study for a PhD at St John's College, Cambridge studying the development and organisation of the nervous system of Caenorhabditis elegans whilst working at the Laboratory of Molecular Biology (LMB) in Cambridge, supervised by John Graham White.

== Career and research ==
Durbin's early work included developing the primary instrument software for one of the first X-ray crystallography area detectors and the MRC Biorad confocal microscope, alongside contributions to neural modelling.

He then led the informatics for the Caenorhabditis elegans genome project, and alongside Jean Thierry-Mieg developed the genome database AceDB, which evolved into the WormBase web resource. Following this he played an important role in data collection for and interpretation of the human genome sequence.

He has developed numerous methods for computational sequence analysis. These include gene finding (e.g. GeneWise) with Ewan Birney and Hidden Markov models for protein and nucleic acid alignment and matching (e.g. HMMER) with Sean Eddy and Graeme Mitchison. A standard textbook Biological Sequence analysis coauthored with Sean Eddy, Anders Krogh and Graeme Mitchison describes some of this work. Using these methods Durbin worked with colleagues to build a series of important genomic data resources, including the protein family database Pfam, the genome database Ensembl, and the gene family database TreeFam.

More recently Durbin has returned to sequencing and has developed low coverage approaches to population genome sequencing, applied first to yeast, and has been one of the leaders in the application of new sequencing technology to study human genome variation. Durbin currently co-leads the international 1000 Genomes Project to characterise variation down to 1% allele frequency as a foundation for human genetics.

=== Awards and honours ===
Durbin was a joint winner of the Mullard Award of the Royal Society in 1994 (for work on the confocal microscope), won the Lord Lloyd of Kilgerran Award of the Foundation for Science and Technology in 2004, and was elected a Fellow of the Royal Society (FRS) in 2004 and a member of the European Molecular Biology Organization (EMBO) in 2009. The Royal Society awarded its Gabor Medal to Durbin in 2017 for his contributions to computational biology. In 2023 he received the International Prize for Biology for his work on the Biology of Genomes. In 2026, Durbin was awarded the Genetics Society Medal for his outstanding contributions to genetics and the International Society for Computational Biology Accomplishments by a Senior Scientist Award.

Durbin's certificate of election for the Royal Society reads:

Durbin is distinguished for his powerful contribution to computational biology. In particular, he played a leading role in establishing the new field of bioinformatics. This allows the handling of biological data on an unprecedented scale, enabling genomics to prosper. He led the analysis of the C. elegans genome, and with Thierry-Mieg developed the database software AceDB. In the international genome project he led the analysis of protein coding genes. He introduced key computational tools in software and data handling. His Pfam database allowed the identification of domains in new protein sequences; it used hidden Markov models to which approach generally he brought rigour and which led to covariance models for RNA sequence.

== Personal life ==
Durbin is the son of James Durbin and is married to Julie Ahringer, a scientist at the Gurdon Institute. They have two children.
