= Research Parasite Award =

The Research Parasite Award
- Awarded for: Outstanding contributions to the rigorous secondary analysis of data
- Hosted by: Endowment housed at the University of Pennsylvania
- First award: 2017
- Website: https://researchparasite.com/

The Research Parasite Award is an honor given annually at the Pacific Symposium on Biocomputing to recognize scientists who study previously published data in ways not anticipated by the researchers who first generated it. The tongue-in-cheek name of the award refers to a New England Journal of Medicine editorial that coined the term "research parasite" to disparage such work. The idea was first suggested on Twitter by Iowa State University researcher Iddo Friedberg shortly after the editorial was published, and was then initiated by Casey Greene, a pharmacologist at the University of Pennsylvania.

Two Research Parasite Awards are given to recognize scientists who have made outstanding and rigorous contributions to analysis of secondary data in biology. Recipients must reuse data generated by someone else to extend, replicate, or disprove a research study in a reproducible manner. The junior parasite award recognizes an outstanding contribution from an early career scientist such as a postdoctoral, graduate, or undergraduate trainee. The senior parasitism award recognizes an individual who has engaged in exemplary research parasitism for a sustained period of time. Since the launch of the award in 2017, a travel grant to attend the Pacific Symposium on Biocomputing has been provided to the junior parasite award winner by GigaScience. Starting for the 2019 award year the awards are supported in part by an endowment housed at the University of Pennsylvania.

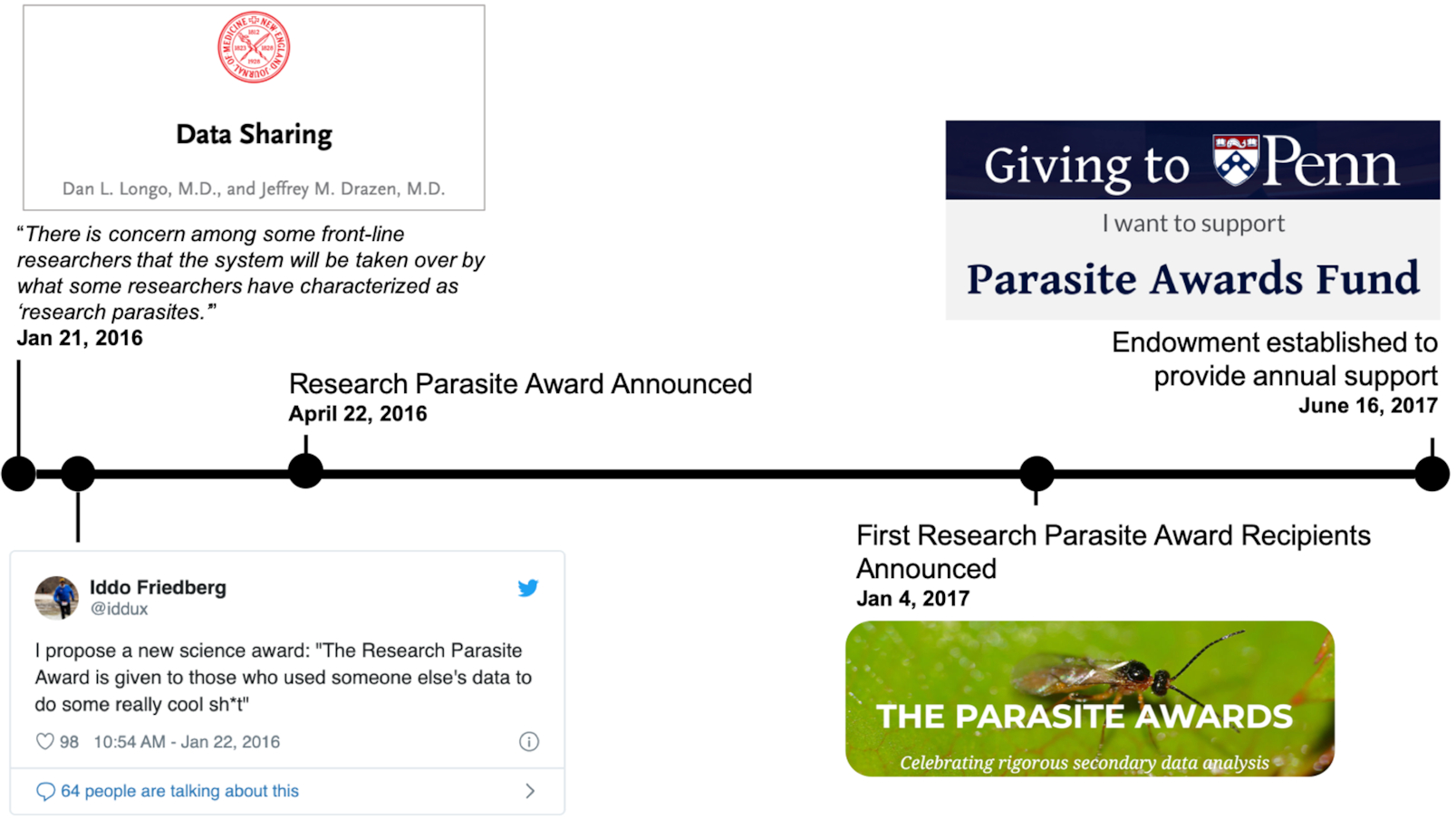
Timeline of the creation of the Research Parasite Award. From "Data detectives, self-love, and humility: a research parasite's perspective" by 2019 Junior award winner Claire Duvallet.

The Research Symbiont Awards, inspired by the Research Parasite Award, was founded by J. Brian Byrd, a physician-scientist at the University of Michigan. Recognizing exemplars in the practice of data sharing, they are given to scientists working in any area of study who have shared data beyond the expectations of their field. Unlike a parasite, naming the data sharing award after symbionts helps stress that this process can be mutually beneficial to the data producing "host" because it increases the scientific impact of their investigators. From 2021 the award has been sponsored by the Wellcome Trust and Dragon Master Foundation. The 2021 winners of the General Symbionts prize were Zhang Yongzhen and Edward C. Holmes for their sharing of the sequence of the first SARSCov2 genome.

== Nomination and selection procedures ==
Recipients self-nominate using a letter that references their published manuscripts that exemplify data reuse in a manner that enhances reproducibility. These published manuscripts should describe original scientific research that involves data re-use, or the secondary analysis of shared data and that extend, replicate, or disprove the results from the original manuscript describing the data.

The nomination materials are reviewed by the Selection Committee, which is made up of at least 3 four-year term positions as well as the past two recipients of the Sustained Parasitism award.

== Award laureates ==
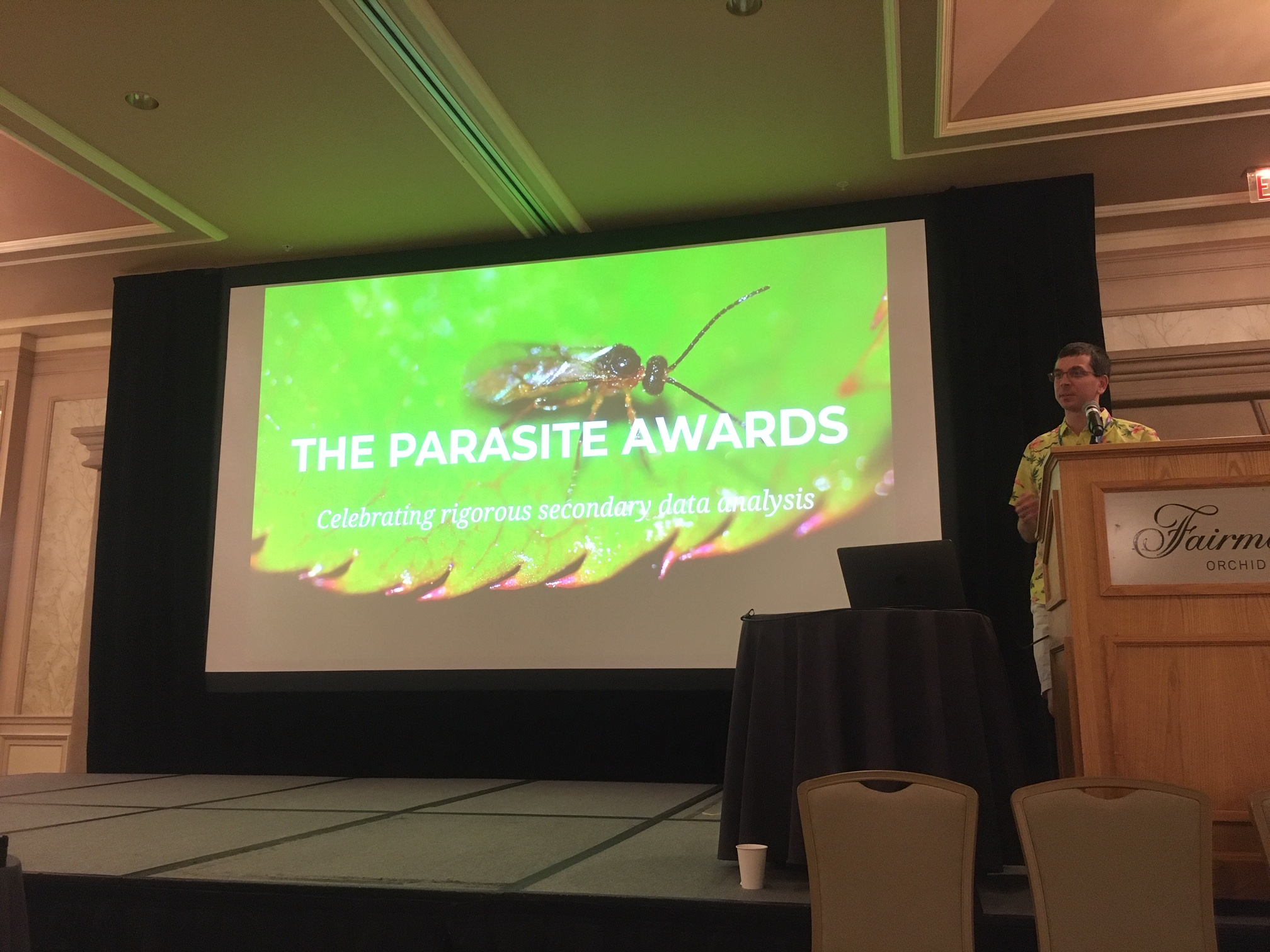
Casey Greene presenting the 2020 award at PSB in Hawaii.

2017

- Kun-Hsing Yu – Junior Parasite
- Erick Turner – Sustained Parasitism

2018

- Uri Ben-David – Junior Parasite
- Julie Dunning Hotopp – Sustained Parasitism

2019

- Claire Duvallet – Junior Parasite
- Rafael Irizarry – Sustained Parasitism

2020

- Ayush Raman – Junior Parasite
- Kelley Harris – Sustained Parasitism

2021

- Nicolás Nieto – Junior Parasite
- Jordi Paps – Sustained Parasitism

2022

- Jack Pilgrim – Junior Parasite
- A. Murat Eren – Sustained Parasitism

2023

- Michael Skinnider – Junior Parasite
- Benoit Ballester – Sustained Parasitism

2024

- Gina Turco – Junior Parasite
- Sushma Naithani – Sustained Parasitism

2025

- Wout Bittremieux – Junior Parasite

== See also ==
- List of general science and technology awards
- List of awards in bioinformatics and computational biology
