= List of awards in bioinformatics and computational biology =

The following is a list of awards in the fields of bioinformatics and computational biology.

== Awards ==
- ASBMB DeLano Award for Computational Biosciences - "to a scientist for the most accessible and innovative development or application of computer technology to enhance research in the life sciences at the molecular level"
- Benjamin Franklin Award for Open Access in the Life Sciences - "to an individual who has, in his or her practice, promoted free and open access to the materials and methods used in the life sciences"
- ISCB Innovator Award - "leading scientists who are within two decades post-degree, who consistently make outstanding contributions to the field, and who continue to forge new directions"
- ISCB Overton Prize - "for outstanding accomplishment to a scientist in the early to mid stage of his or her career"
- ISCB Accomplishment by a Senior Scientist Award - "members of the computational biology community who are more than 12 to 15 years post-degree and have made major contributions to the field of computational biology through research, education, service, or a combination of the three"
- Morris F. Collen Award of Excellence - "an individual whose personal commitment and dedication to biomedical informatics has made a lasting impression on healthcare and biomedicine"
- Research Parasite Award - "Outstanding contributions to the rigorous secondary analysis of data"
- The SIB Bioinformatics Awards - since 2008, the Swiss Institute of Bioinformatics has delivered awards to acknowledge early career bioinformaticians and ground-breaking resources of national or international standing.

== See also ==
- List of biology awards
- List of computer-related awards
