= Jonathan Eisen =

American evolutionary biologist

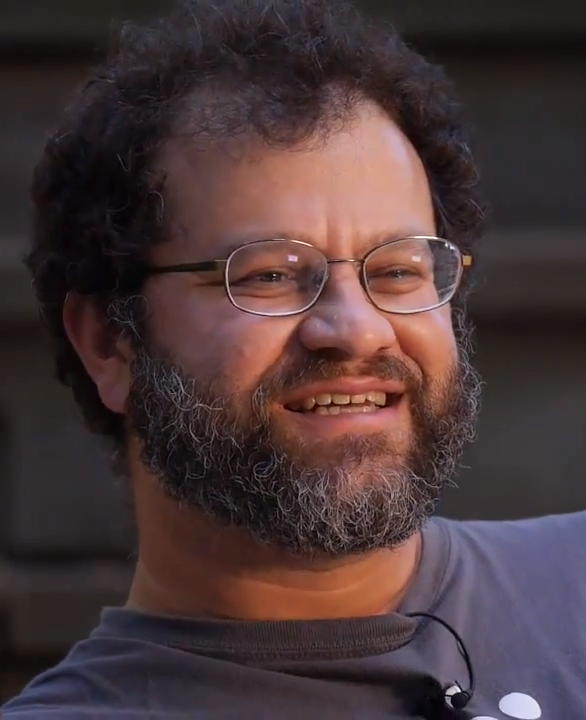
- Eisen in 2013
- Born: Jonathan Andrew Eisen; August 31, 1968 (age 57)
- Education: Harvard University (AB 1990); Stanford University (PhD 1998)
- Known for: PLOS Biology; Evolution textbook
- Awards: Ben Franklin award (2011); Walter J. Gores Award (1995); FAAM (2012)
- Scientific career
- Fields: Genomics; Microbiology; Evolution; Microbial Ecology; Symbiosis
- Workplaces: University of California, Davis; The Institute for Genomic Research
- Thesis: The evolution of DNA repair genes, proteins, and processes (1998)
- Doctoral advisor: Philip Hanawalt
- Website: www.genomecenter.ucdavis.edu/people/jaeisen

Jonathan Andrew Eisen (born August 31, 1968) is an American evolutionary biologist, currently working at University of California, Davis. His academic research is in the fields of evolutionary biology, genomics and microbiology and he was the academic editor-in-chief of the open access journal PLOS Biology between February 2008 and December 2012.

== Education ==
Eisen completed his undergraduate studies at Harvard College in 1990, earning an AB degree in biology. He graduated as a Doctor of Philosophy from Stanford University in 1998 with a thesis on the evolution of DNA repair genes, proteins, and processes in 1998, supervised by Philip Hanawalt.

== Research ==
Eisen featured in a comic strip by Jorge Cham on the occasion of Open Access Week 2012.

Eisen's research focuses on the origin of novelty, how new processes and functions originate in living things. To study this, he focuses on sequencing and analyzing genomes of organisms, especially microbes and using phylogenomic analysis.

Eisen, together with Nick Barton, Derek E.G. Briggs, David B. Goldstein, and Nipam H. Patel, authored the undergraduate textbook, Evolution, that integrates molecular biology, genomics, and human genetics with traditional evolutionary studies. According to Google Scholar his most cited peer-reviewed papers are on the genome sequence of Plasmodium falciparum, sequencing the Sargasso Sea and a paper on the genome of Thermotoga maritima.

Prior to working at UC Davis he was an Investigator at The Institute for Genomic Research.

Eisen and his work is routinely discussed in the scientific and popular press. Examples include a New York Times article on the Genomic Encyclopedia of Bacteria and Archaea in 2009 and extensive coverage of work on searching for a "fourth domain" of life. In addition, Eisen's blogging and microblogging work is frequently written about. His brother Michael Eisen is also a biologist.

== Awards and honors ==
Eisen was awarded the Benjamin Franklin Award (Bioinformatics) in 2011 and the Esquire Magazine's Best and Brightest in 2002. He was awarded the Walter J. Gores Award, Faculty Achievement Awards for Excellence in Teaching. He was elected a Fellow of the American Society for Microbiology (FAAM). He was awarded the UC Davis ADVANCE Scholar Award in 2019, for his work to improve gender equity in STEM through teaching, research, and service.
