= Teri Klein =

American professor

Teri E. Klein
- Education: University of California, Santa Cruz; UCSF
- Awards: Fellow of the American College of Medical Informatics (2001); Fellow of the American Association for the Advancement of Science (2021)
- Scientific career
- Fields: Pharmacogenomics
- Workplaces: Stanford University
- Thesis: KARMA, a knowledge-based system for receptor mapping (1987)
- Website: profiles.stanford.edu/teri-klein

Teri E. Klein is an American professor of Biomedical Data Science and Medicine (and of Genetics, by courtesy) at Stanford University. She is known for her work on pharmacogenomics and computational biology.

== Education ==
Klein has a B.A. from the University of California, Santa Cruz (1980) and a Ph.D. from the University of California, San Francisco (1987). In 2000 she started a position at Stanford University where, as of 2022, she holds the position of professor (research).

She is a co-founder of the Pacific Symposium on Biocomputing and is a Principal Investigator for PharmGKB, Clinical Pharmacogenomics Implementation Consortium (CPIC), The Pharmacogenomic Clinical Annotation Tool (PharmCAT), and Clinical Genome Resource (ClinGen).

== Selected publications ==
- Chen, Rui; Mias, George I.; Li-Pook-Than, Jennifer; Jiang, Lihua; Lam, Hugo Y. K.; Chen, Rong; Miriami, Elana; Karczewski, Konrad J.; Hariharan, Manoj; Dewey, Frederick E.; Cheng, Yong; Clark, Michael J.; Im, Hogune; Habegger, Lukas; Balasubramanian, Suganthi (2012-03-16). "Personal Omics Profiling Reveals Dynamic Molecular and Medical Phenotypes". Cell. 148 (6): 1293–1307. doi:10.1016/j.cell.2012.02.009. ISSN 0092-8674. PMC 3341616. PMID 22424236.
- Whirl-Carrillo, M; McDonagh, E M; Hebert, J M; Gong, L; Sangkuhl, K; Thorn, C F; Altman, R B; Klein, T E (2012). "Pharmacogenomics Knowledge for Personalized Medicine". Clinical Pharmacology & Therapeutics. 92 (4): 414–417. doi:10.1038/clpt.2012.96. ISSN 0009-9236. PMC 3660037. PMID 22992668.
- Gammal, Roseann S.; Caudle, Kelly E.; Klein, Teri E.; Relling, Mary V. (2019). "Considerations for pharmacogenomic testing in a health system". Genetics in Medicine. 21 (8): 1886–1887. doi:10.1038/s41436-018-0421-x. ISSN 1530-0366. PMID 30631112. S2CID 58004988.
- Gong, Li; Whirl-Carrillo, Michelle; Klein, Teri E. (2021). "PharmGKB, an Integrated Resource of Pharmacogenomic Knowledge". Current Protocols. 1 (8): e226. doi:10.1002/cpz1.226. ISSN 2691-1299. PMC 8650697. PMID 34387941.

== Awards and honors ==
Klein was named a fellow of the American College of Medical Informatics in 2001. In 2021, she was named a fellow of the American Association for the Advancement of Science.
