= Conserved Domain Database =

Biological database

CDD

Content
- Description: Conserved Domain Database for the functional annotation of proteins.

Contact
- Research center: National Center for Biotechnology Information
- Authors: Aron Marchler-Bauer
- Primary citation: Marchler-Bauer & al. (2013)
- Release date: 2003

Access
- Website: https://www.ncbi.nlm.nih.gov/Structure/cdd/cdd.shtml

The Conserved Domain Database (CDD) is a database of well-annotated multiple sequence alignment models and derived database search models, for ancient domains and full-length proteins. The database consists of position-specific score matrices and serves as resource for protein annotation such as identification of conserved domain or inference of functional site.

== Philosophy ==
Domains can be thought of as distinct functional and/or structural units of a protein. These two classifications coincide rather often, as a matter of fact, and what is found as an independently folding unit of a polypeptide chain also carries specific function. Domains are often identified as recurring (sequence or structure) units, which may exist in various contexts. In molecular evolution such domains may have been utilized as building blocks, and may have been recombined in different arrangements to modulate protein function. CDD defines conserved domains as recurring units in molecular evolution, the extents of which can be determined by sequence and structure analysis.

The goal of the NCBI conserved domain curation project is to provide database users with insights into how patterns of residue conservation and divergence in a family relate to functional properties, and to provide useful links to more detailed information that may help to understand those sequence/structure/function relationships. To do this, CDD Curators include the following types of information in order to supplement and enrich the traditional multiple sequence alignments that form the foundation of domain models: 3-dimensional structures and conserved core motifs, conserved features/sites, phylogenetic organization, links to electronic literature resources.

== Content ==
CDD content includes NCBI manually curated domain models and domain models imported from a number of external source databases (Pfam, SMART, COG, PRK, TIGRFAMs). What is unique about NCBI-curated domains is that they use 3D-structure information to explicitly define domain boundaries, align blocks, amend alignment details, and provide insights into sequence/structure/function relationships. Manually curated models are organized hierarchically if they describe domain families that are clearly related by common descent. To provide a non-redundant view of the data, CDD clusters similar domain models from various sources into superfamilies.

== Searching the database ==
The collection is also part of NCBI's Entrez query and retrieval system, crosslinked to numerous other resources. CDD provides annotation of domain footprints and conserved functional sites on protein sequences. Precalculated domain annotation can be retrieved for protein sequences tracked in NCBI's Entrez system, and CDD's collection of models can be queried with novel protein sequences via * "the CD-Search service". United States National Center for Biotechnology Information., or at* "the Batch CD-Search". United States National Center for Biotechnology Information., that allows the computation and download of annotation for large sets of protein queries.
