= GeneSweep =

Online genetics betting pool

GeneSweep: Gene Sweepstake
- Date: May 10, 2000 – May 30, 2003
- Duration: 3 years and 20 days
- Venue: Cold Spring Harbor Laboratory; Ensembl genome database project
- Location: Global
- Type: Sweepstake; Scientific wager
- Theme: Genetics; Genomics
- Motive: Estimating total number of genes in the human genome
- Organised by: Ewan Birney; David Stewart
- Participants: 460 bets
- Awards: $1,200 prize
- Website: www.ensembl.org/genesweep.html

GeneSweep or Gene Sweepstake was a sweepstake and scientific wager for scientists to bet on the total number of genes in the human genome. The sweepstake was started at a Cold Spring Harbor Laboratory conference in 2000. Initially, bets could be placed for $1, which was raised to $5 in 2001 and to $20 in 2002. The cost of placing a bet increased significantly because later participants were expected to have much more accurate information available to inform their guesses. By May 23, 2000, 228 bets had been placed, with the average number of predicted genes among them being 62,598.

== Winning bets in 2003 ==
On May 30, 2003, Ewan Birney of the European Bioinformatics Institute, who had organized the pool, announced the winner: Lee Rowen of the Institute for Systems Biology. Rowen had guessed that the human genome would contain 25,947 genes, which was the closest to the estimated number of 24,847 given by the Ensembl genome database project. In addition to being the winning guess, this was also the lowest of the more than 460 bets that were placed. Rowen split the $1,200 prize pool with Paul Dear of the Medical Research Council (MRC) and Olivier Jaillon of Genoscope. Rowen credited Jean Weissenbach of Genoscope with convincing her that the true number of human genes would be relatively low. All three winners shared the prize because they were the only betters who guessed under 30,000, and Birney was certain that the total number of genes was less than that. The sweepstakes had always been planned to end in 2003, because Birney had expected that Ensembl would have completed counting the number of human genes by then. Once it became clear that they would need more time to arrive at an exact number, Birney initially planned on extending the sweepstakes for five more years. However, David Stewart convinced Birney to choose a winner by pointing out that the rules specified that a winner had to be chosen in 2003, with no exceptions. Birney noted that, though the exact number was still unknown, there was no doubt that the number of human genes was much less than 26,000, and he announced that 21,000 was the best estimate in a 2003 talk.

== Ongoing debate after 2003 ==
As of 2018 there is continuing debate amongst scientists about the total number of genes in the human genome, with most estimates ranging from 19,000 and 22,000.
