= TIGRFAMs =

TIGRFAMs is a database of protein families designed to support manual and automated genome annotation. Each entry includes a multiple sequence alignment and hidden Markov model (HMM) built from the alignment. Sequences that score above the defined cutoffs of a given TIGRFAMs HMM are assigned to that protein family and may be assigned the corresponding annotations. Most models describe protein families found in Bacteria and Archaea.

Like Pfam, TIGRFAMs uses the HMMER package written by Sean Eddy.

== History ==
TIGRFAMs was produced originally at The Institute for Genomic Research (TIGR) and its successor, J. Craig Venter Institute (JCVI), but it moved in April 2018 to the National Center for Biotechnology Information (NCBI). TIGRFAMs remains a member database in InterPro. The last version from JCVI, release 15.0, contained 4488 models. TIGRFAMs now continues at NCBI as part of a larger collection of HMMs, called NCBIFAMs, used in its RefSeq and PGAP genome annotation pipelines. Active curation and revision of TIGRFAMs models continues at NCBI, but the creation of TIGRFAMs models per se has ended, as newly constructed HMMs from the RefSeq group receive different designations when added to NCBIFAMs.
