= Michael Eisen =

American computational biologist and journal editor

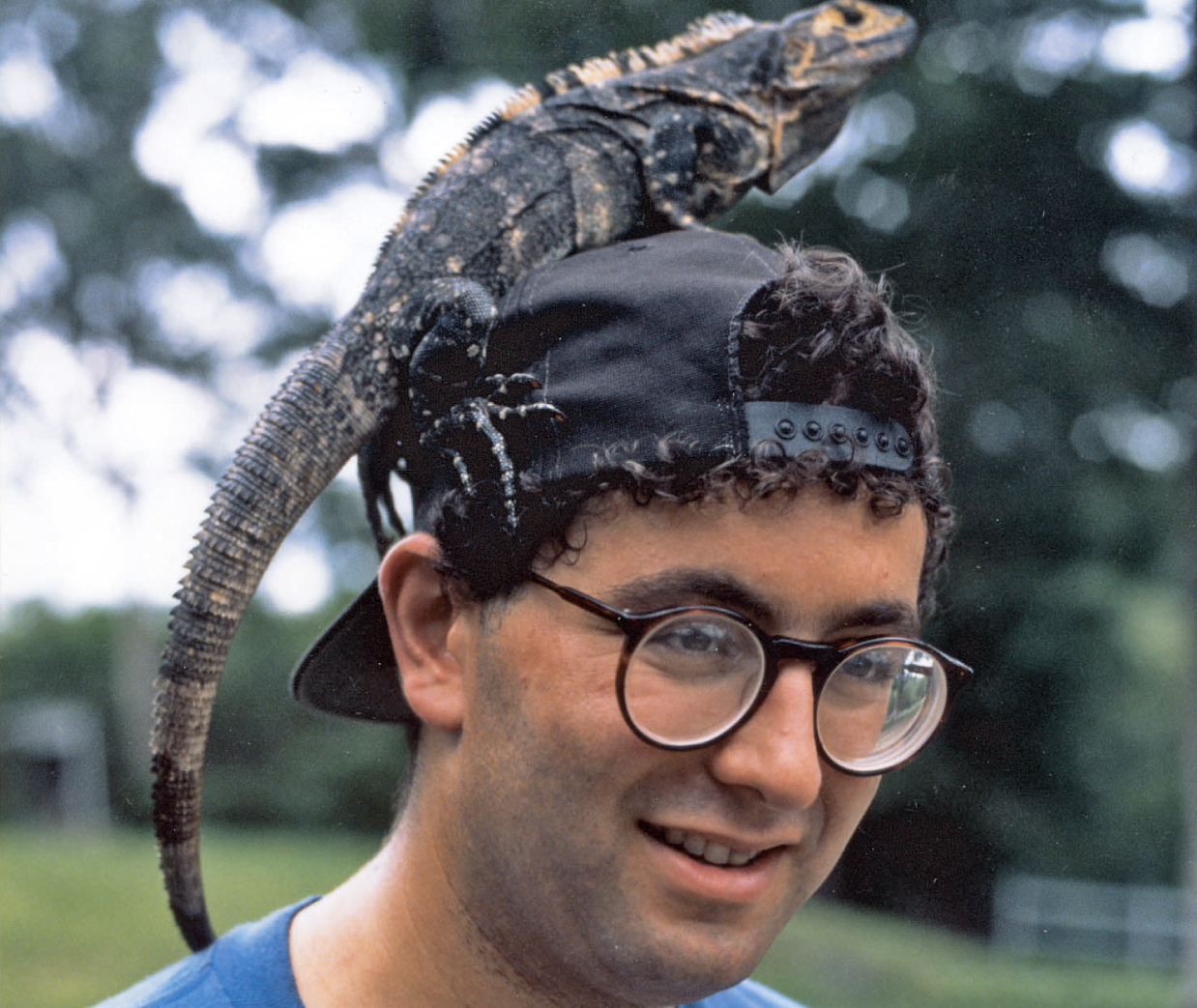
- Born: Michael Bruce Eisen; April 13, 1967 (age 59); Boston, Massachusetts, United States
- Education: Harvard University (AB, PhD)
- Known for: Public Library of Science (PLOS)
- Awards: Benjamin Franklin Award (Bioinformatics) (2002)
- Scientific career
- Fields: Biology; Genetics; Genomics; Evolution; Development
- Workplaces: University of California, Berkeley
- Thesis: Structural Studies of Influenza A Virus Proteins (1996)
- Doctoral advisor: Don Craig Wiley
- Website: michaeleisen.org

Michael Bruce Eisen (born April 13, 1967) is an American computational biologist and the former editor-in-chief of the journal eLife. He is a professor of genetics, genomics and development at University of California, Berkeley. He is a leading advocate of open access scientific publishing and is co-founder of Public Library of Science (PLOS). In 2018, Eisen announced his candidacy U.S. Senate from California as an independent, though he failed to qualify for the ballot.

== Early life and education ==
Born in Boston, Eisen and his brother Jonathan were raised in a family of scientists. Their grandfather was an x-ray crystallographer, their father, Howard Eisen a physician, and mother, Laura a biochemist. They moved to Bethesda, Maryland when Eisen was four or five years old. The brothers spent summers in Long Island with their grandparents. Eisen states that he loved frogs and salamanders '"Even more than I have a frog fetish, I have a swamp fetish. I really like being in swamps."' He was also very interested in math and was captain of the high school math team. Eisen graduated from Walt Whitman High School in 1985. Intending to major in mathematics at Harvard University, he realized that there [he may encounter] other more brilliant math students, it was a Good Will Hunting moment and he decided that he did not want to major in mathematics, '"You don't want to be Salieri to Mozart."' During his years at Harvard, Eisen worked on "unlocking the three-dimensional structures of proteins." He was shown a DNA microarray which taught him a '"new way of doing biology"'.

Eisen completed his PhD at Harvard University in biophysics and a B.S. (also from Harvard) in Math. He was under the supervision of Don Craig Wiley while studying Influenza A virus Proteins.

There are things that are really really difficult, those are the kinds of problems you do want to work on. It's not that easy to tell the difference between impossible problems and a problem that is really really difficult. But learning to do so is critically important. - Things I learned from working with Pat Brown (Patrick O. Brown) - 2015

After earning his doctorate, Eisen was a Postdoctoral Fellow at Stanford University in the lab of David Botstein, where he most notably developed a method for interpreting gene expression data from microarrays. The seminal research publication that Eisen authored about this project has been cited over 16,000 times.

=== Baseball and biology ===
When Eisen lived in Tennessee he worked as a play-by-play announcer for a minor league baseball team, the Columbia Mules. He is a self-proclaimed Red Sox fanatic. He and computational biologist James Fraser recorded a video for iBiology about the role baseball statistics influenced their research. Their argument is that sequencing DNA is similar to scoring a baseball game, and that many computational biologists learned to think about science computations from an obsessive interest in baseball stats. The exercise of comparing a specific player's stats to a database of other similar players allows a baseball fan to predict future performance. This same system works with proteins and predicting functions. As tools are developed that break down and track all stats concerning baseball players, so will technology improve with genetics. With both baseball and genetics, tools are being developed that refine the models. In a lecture in 2015, Eisen stated that he received a computer from his grandfather for his twelfth birthday and spent the next five years teaching himself how to program so that he could keep track of baseball stats.

== Research ==
His academic research focuses on the evolution of gene regulation. Despite this focus, Eisen's work has historically spanned very diverse disciplines. For example, his 5 most cited papers cover a broad range of topics including methods for hierarchical clustering, applications to human breast cancers (with David Botstein and Charles Perou), and discovery of tumor subtypes in diffuse large B cell lymphoma (with Ash Alizadeh and Louis Staudt). His more recent research work has been on fruit flies and Drosophila and how they "develop from a tiny single-celled egg to a mature adult. He says they hold insights into what goes wrong in people as they age." He receives funding from the Howard Hughes Medical Institute for his research.

== 2018 U.S. Senate race ==
Eisen announced through Twitter on January 25 his intent to run for U.S. Senate from California in 2018 for Democratic Senator Dianne Feinstein's seat, registering the Twitter handle SenatorPhD. His campaign slogan was "Liberty, Equality, Reality". Eisen's reasons for running for Congress included his perception that the Trump administration was unresponsive to climate change and other science-related issues. Another reason Eisen decided to run was his experience watching Cabinet appointees being interviewed by the Senate about climate change. He thought '“It would be really nice to have scientists ask the questions of the Cabinet appointees, because the senators don’t seem to understand the issue and aren’t asking the right questions.”' He feels that if science is to be on the forefront of policy making, '"scientists need to run for office."' He felt that 2018's California jungle primaries afforded him a better chance at making the final two for the general election, but he did not make the final two (which were Dianne Feinstein and Kevin de León).

For a really long time, scientists have watched political processes erode — and have watched politicians openly deride science, dismissing the role that science plays in our everyday life. Scientists have been sitting here hoping that someone would come along and defend those principals. Politics, in my mind, should function similar to science. We should try to figure out what’s going on in the world and then debate the best way to do it, to make the world better. The best tools we have to characterize reality are the observational tools that science uses all the time. Too much of politics has rejected that basic principle that scientists live and breathe all the time.

Eisen dropped out of the race when he failed to qualify for the June 2018 primary ballot.

== eLife editorship and firing ==
In 2019, Eisen was named the second editor-in-chief of the open-access scientific journal eLife.

In 2020, in response to a Twitter question, Eisen joked that the roundworm C. elegans was the most over-hyped animal because "they wiggle forward. They wiggle backwards. And occasionally they fuck themselves. That’s it". Some researchers were not amused by the joke, and the eLife board asked Eisen to watch his language on Twitter. Also in 2020, Eisen was involved in the story surrounding the death from SARS-CoV-2 of an anonymous queer Hopi female professor with whom he had interacted on Twitter. The account turned out to be a hoax created and run by neuroscientist BethAnn McLaughlin, who founded MeTooSTEM. Eisen was one of three people to attend a Zoom memorial for the fictional individual.

In 2023, under his leadership, the journal moved away from the traditional "review, then publish" model, instead requiring authors to submit preprints and then publishing journal editors' reviews alongside manuscripts, meaning that the journal neither accepted nor rejected submissions. Eisen said that the move was intended to reduce the prominence of the publisher, and instead focus attention on authors and their work. This move provoked both enthusiastic praise from some, including some eLife editors, and a strong backlash from others inside the organization, including some senior editors and editors. A news article in the journal Nature described the “Strife at eLife”. At least one of five deputy editors resigned. In a private letter to Eisen in January 2023, 30 editors threatened to resign once the changes were fully implemented. In March 2023, 29 eLife editors, including founding editor-in-chief and Nobel Prize winner Randy Schekman, urged that Eisen should be replaced immediately in a letter to the executive editor of the journal’s publisher. Eisen dismissed this in an interview as “powerful scientists not wanting to change a system that has benefited them”. Eisen tweeted on March 12, 2023, that academics were "lobbying hard to get me fired", a post that was subsequently deleted. He later described his relationship with the board as “somewhat testy” and that some “had it in for me”.

On October 13, 2023, soon after Hamas attacked Israel, Eisen tweeted a story from by the satirical website The Onion with the headline: "Dying Gazans Criticized For Not Using Last Words To Condemn Hamas." Eisen said "The Onion speaks with more courage, insight and moral clarity than the leaders of every academic institution put together. I wish there were a @TheOnion university". The post prompted some criticism, including from Israeli researchers who asked colleagues to avoid publishing in eLife as long as he was editor. The chair of eLife’s board asked Eisen to delete his Twitter post, but he refused to do so "because that would be capitulating to what I thought was a really misdirected effort to silence any expression of support of Palestinians". On October 23, 2023, Eisen was fired by eLife. In response to the firing, at least five of eLife's editors resigned and other scientists said they would stop participating in eLife events in solidarity with Eisen. A petition letter was organised to protest against Eisen’s firing. The petition, which was signed by over 2,000 scientists, academics and researchers, said eLife's action is having a "chilling effect" on freedom of expression in academia.

eLife released a statement saying "Mike has been given clear feedback from the board that his approach to leadership, communication and social media has at key times been detrimental to the cohesion of the community we are trying to build and hence to eLife’s mission. It is against this background that a further incidence of this behaviour has contributed to the board’s decision". Eisen's response was "They were referring to that fucking worm thing. I’m not even kidding!". An eLife spokesperson clarified in an email to The Hindu, saying “We value and respect everyone’s right to freedom of speech including political expression and the legal right to protest. Particularly for those in leadership positions, exercising that right comes with responsibilities: an expectation to show good judgement and a duty of care to the communities they serve. We don’t believe those qualities have been demonstrated.”

In eLife’s 2023 annual report, the Chair of the Board of Directors said: “In October, we parted ways with our Editor-in-Chief, Michael Eisen, and want to acknowledge the extraordinary vision and leadership he provided to eLife, which is allowing us to build on his legacy as we grow our publishing model.”

On November 10, 2023, in response to a tweet saying “How to make faculty meeting more exciting? Wrong answers only.”, Eisen tweeted “Sit me next to Randy Schekman.”, indicating an ongoing personal conflict with the preceding editor-in-chief.

== Open access advocacy ==
Throughout his career he has been an advocate for "open science", which is the free release of the material and intellectual product of scientific research. He is a leading advocate of open access scientific publishing and is co-founder of Public Library of Science (PLOS) and serves on the PLOS board, the Academic Steering & Advocacy Committee of Open Library of Humanities, and is an adviser to Science Commons.

In 2012 Eisen began protesting against the Research Works Act as part of his appeal to promote open access to information.

== Awards and honors ==
In 2002, Eisen was awarded the inaugural Benjamin Franklin Award in bioinformatics, for his work on PLOS and the open-access availability of his microarray cluster analysis software.
