= Benjamin Franklin Award (Bioinformatics) =

Annual award by Bioinformatics.org

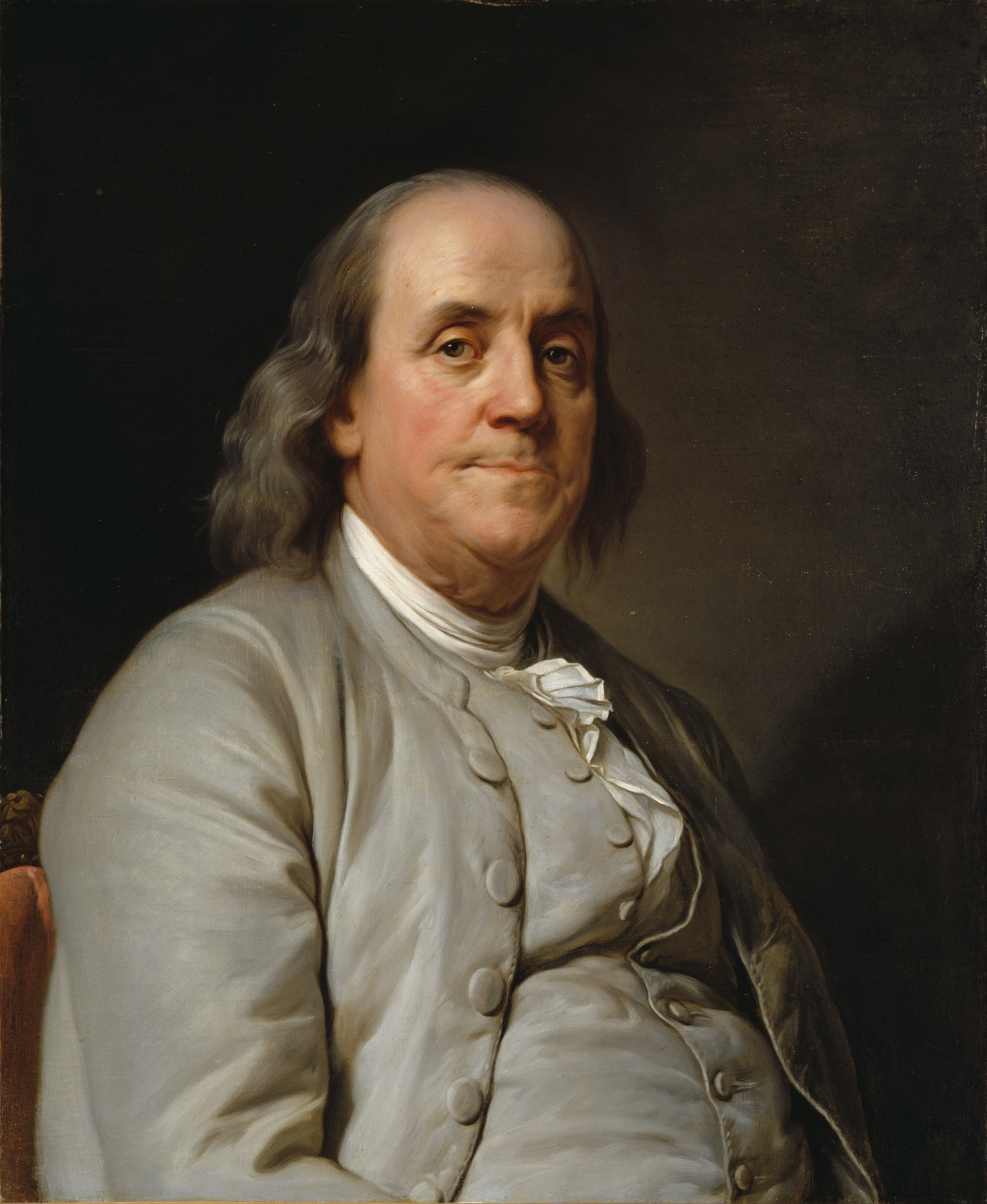
- Benjamin Franklin (1706-1790)
- Awarded for: an individual who has, in his or her practice, promoted free and open access to the materials and methods used in the life sciences.
- Sponsored by: Bioinformatics.org
- First award: 2002
- Website: www.bioinformatics.org/franklin/

The Benjamin Franklin Award is an annual award for Open Access in the Life Sciences presented by Bioinformatics.org to an individual who has, in his or her practice, promoted free and open access to the materials and methods used in the life sciences.

== Laureates ==
Source: bioinformatics.org

- 2002 - Michael B. Eisen
- 2003 - Jim Kent
- 2004 - Lincoln D. Stein
- 2005 - Ewan Birney
- 2006 - Michael Ashburner
- 2007 - Sean Eddy
- 2008 - Robert Gentleman
- 2009 - Philip E. Bourne
- 2010 - Alex Bateman
- 2011 - Jonathan Eisen
- 2012 - Heng Li
- 2013 - Steven Salzberg
- 2014 - Helen M. Berman
- 2015 - Owen White
- 2016 - Benjamin Langmead
- 2017 - Rafael Irizarry
- 2018 - Desmond G. Higgins
- 2019 - Eugene Koonin
- 2020 - Xiaole Shirley Liu

== See also ==
- Awards in Bioinformatics and Computational Biology
- List of biology awards
- Prizes named after people
