= Oligotyping (taxonomy) =

Classification of organisms

Oligotyping is a diagnostic or molecular biological method for classification of organisms by short intervals of primary DNA sequence.

Oligotyping 'systems' are sets of recognized target sequences which identify the members of the categories within the classification. The classification may be for the purpose of primary biological taxonomy, or for a functional classification.

== Classifying bacteria ==
Oligotyping has been used for classifying bacteria, identifying bacterial antibiotic resistance genes, identifying genetic factors in human infectious disease, and performing histocompatibility tests for human blood or bone marrow donors/recipients .

== See also ==
- Oligotyping (sequencing)
- Taxonomy (biology)
- Bacterial taxonomy
