= Oligotyping (sequencing) =

Oligotyping is the process of correcting DNA sequence measured during the process of DNA sequencing based on frequency data of related sequences across related samples.

== History ==
DNA sequences were originally read from sequencing gels by eye. With the advent of computerized base callers, humans no longer 'called' the bases and instead 'corrected' the called bases. The bases were called by the software using the relative intensity of each putative basepair signal and the local spacing of the signals.

With the advent of high throughput sequencing, the volume of sequence to be corrected exceeded human capacity for sequence correction.

== Use ==
Multiple applications require single-base pair accuracy across populations of closely related sequences. An example is amplicon sequencing to assess the relative contribution of DNA from diverse organisms to a sample.

The requirement for single basepair accuracy led to the development of methods which drew on frequency data distributed across several samples to identify variant sequences which shared the same frequency profile and were thus likely errors from the same original sequence. The ability to use higher-order statistics to correct sequences is an important element in decreasing the burden of error in DNA sequence datasets.

== See also ==
- DNA sequencing theory
- DNA sequencer
- Oligotyping (taxonomy)
