= Sean Eddy =

American professor at Harvard University

- Sean Eddy
- Born: Sean Roberts Eddy
- Education: California Institute of Technology (BS); University of Colorado Boulder (PhD)
- Known for: HMMER; Infernal; Pfam; Rfam
- Awards: Ben Franklin award (2007)
- Scientific career
- Fields: Computational Genome Analysis
- Workplaces: Howard Hughes Medical Institute (HHMI); Harvard University; Janelia Farm Research Campus; Washington University in St. Louis; Laboratory of Molecular Biology (LMB)
- Thesis: Introns in the T-even bacteriophages (1991)
- Doctoral advisor: Larry Gold
- Other academic advisors: John Sulston; Richard Durbin
- Website: cryptogenomicon.org; www.hhmi.org/scientists/sean-r-eddy

Sean Roberts Eddy is a professor of molecular and cellular biology and of applied mathematics at Harvard University. Previously he was based at the Janelia Research Campus from 2006 to 2015 in Virginia. His research interests are in bioinformatics, computational biology and biological sequence analysis. As of 2016 projects include the use of Hidden Markov models in HMMER, Infernal Pfam and Rfam.

== Education ==
Eddy graduated June 1982 from Marion Center Area High School. He then completed a Bachelor of Science in Biology at California Institute of Technology in 1986, followed by a Doctor of Philosophy in molecular biology at the University of Colorado Boulder under the supervision of Larry Gold in 1991 studying the T4 phage.

== Career ==
From 1992 to 1995 he was a postdoctoral research fellow at the Medical Research Council (MRC) Laboratory of Molecular Biology (LMB) in Cambridge UK working with John Sulston and Richard Durbin. From 1995 to 2007 he worked at Washington University School of Medicine and has been working for the Howard Hughes Medical Institute since 2000.

== Awards and honours ==
In 2007, Sean was the winner of the Benjamin Franklin Award in Bioinformatics for contributions to Open Access in the Life Sciences.

In 2022, Eddy was elected as a Fellow of the International Society for Computational Biology.
