= Cell culture =

Process by which cells are grown under controlled conditions

The growth, in an artificial medium, of cells derived from living tissues. This provides an in vitro model of the tissue and biological activities that occur in the cells of living organisms.

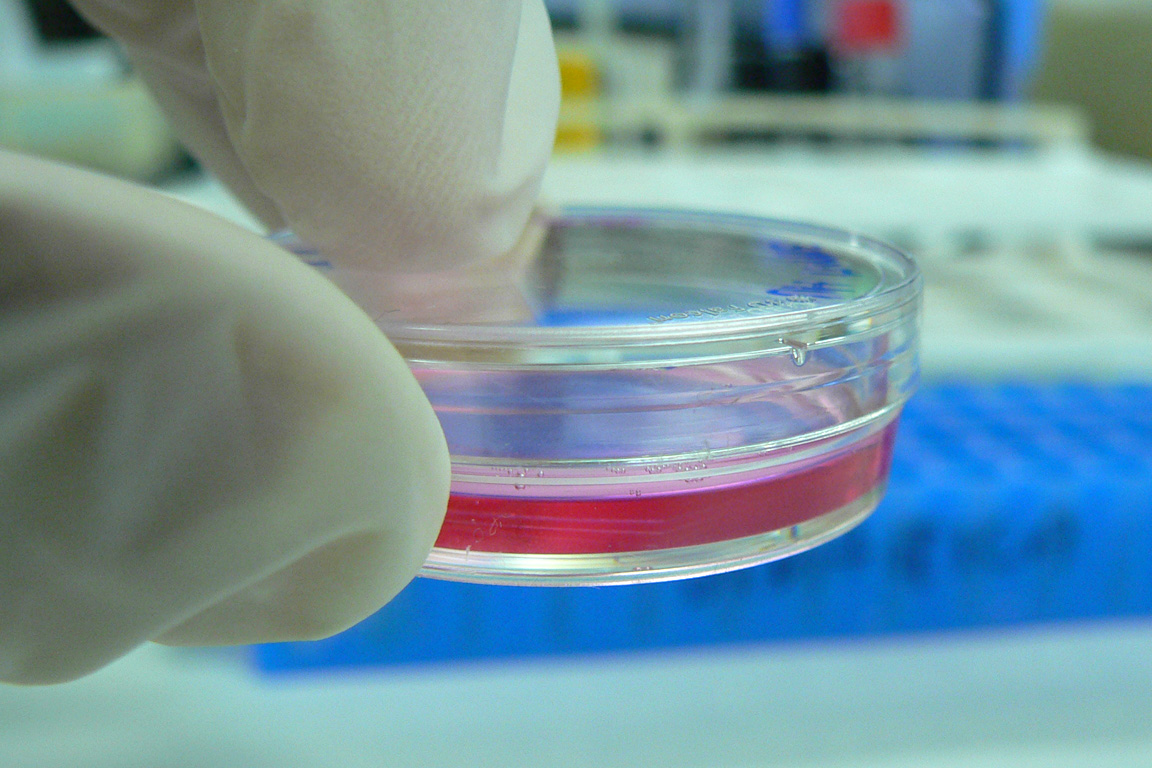
Cell culture in a small Petri dish

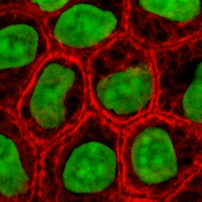
Epithelial cells in culture, stained for keratin (red) and DNA (green)

Cell culture or tissue culture is the process by which cells are grown under controlled conditions, generally outside of their natural environment. After cells of interest have been isolated from living tissue, they can subsequently be maintained under carefully controlled conditions. They need to be kept at body temperature (37 °C) in an incubator. These conditions vary for each cell type, but generally consist of a suitable vessel with a substrate or rich medium that supplies the essential nutrients (amino acids, carbohydrates, vitamins, minerals), growth factors, hormones, and gases (CO_{2}, O_{2}), and regulates the physio-chemical environment (pH buffer, osmotic pressure, temperature). Most cells require a surface or an artificial substrate to form an adherent culture as a monolayer (one single-cell thick), whereas others can be grown free floating in a medium as a suspension culture. This is typically facilitated via use of a liquid, semi-solid, or solid growth medium, such as broth or agar. Tissue culture commonly refers to the culture of animal cells and tissues, with the more specific term plant tissue culture being used for plants. The lifespan of most cells is genetically determined, but some cell-culturing cells have been 'transformed' into immortal cells which will reproduce indefinitely if the optimal conditions are provided.

In practice, the term "cell culture" now refers to the culturing of cells derived from multicellular eukaryotes, especially animal cells, in contrast with other types of culture that also grow cells, such as plant tissue culture, fungal culture, and microbiological culture (of microbes). The historical development and methods of cell culture are closely interrelated with those of tissue culture and organ culture. Viral culture is also related, with cells as hosts for the viruses.

The laboratory technique of maintaining live cell lines (a population of cells descended from a single cell and containing the same genetic makeup) separated from their original tissue source became more robust in the middle 20th century.

== History ==
The 19th-century English physiologist Sydney Ringer developed salt solutions containing the chlorides of sodium, potassium, calcium and magnesium suitable for maintaining the beating of an isolated animal heart outside the body. In 1885 Wilhelm Roux removed a section of the medullary plate of an embryonic chicken and maintained it in a warm saline solution for several days, establishing the basic principle of tissue culture. In 1907 the zoologist Ross Granville Harrison demonstrated the growth of frog embryonic cells that would give rise to nerve cells in a medium of clotted lymph. In 1913, E. Steinhardt, C. Israeli, and R. A. Lambert grew vaccinia virus in fragments of guinea pig corneal tissue. In 1996, the first use of regenerative tissue was used to replace a small length of urethra, which led to the understanding that the technique of obtaining samples of tissue, growing it outside the body without a scaffold, and reapplying it, can be used for only small distances of less than 1 cm. Ross Granville Harrison, working at Johns Hopkins Medical School and then at Yale University, published results of his experiments from 1907 to 1910, establishing the methodology of tissue culture.

Gottlieb Haberlandt first pointed out the possibilities of the culture of isolated tissues, plant tissue culture. He suggested that the potentialities of individual cells via tissue culture as well as that the reciprocal influences of tissues on one another could be determined by this method. Since Haberlandt's original assertions, methods for tissue and cell culture have been realized, leading to significant discoveries in biology and medicine. He presented his original idea of totipotentiality in 1902, stating that "Theoretically all plant cells are able to give rise to a complete plant." The term tissue culture was coined by American pathologist Montrose Thomas Burrows.

Cell culture techniques were advanced significantly in the 1940s and 1950s to support research in virology. Growing viruses in cell cultures allowed preparation of purified viruses for the manufacture of vaccines. The injectable polio vaccine developed by Jonas Salk was one of the first products mass-produced using cell culture techniques. This vaccine was made possible by the cell culture research of John Franklin Enders, Thomas Huckle Weller, and Frederick Chapman Robbins, who were awarded a Nobel Prize for their discovery of a method of growing the virus in monkey kidney cell cultures. Cell culture has contributed to the development of vaccines for many diseases.

== Modern usage ==
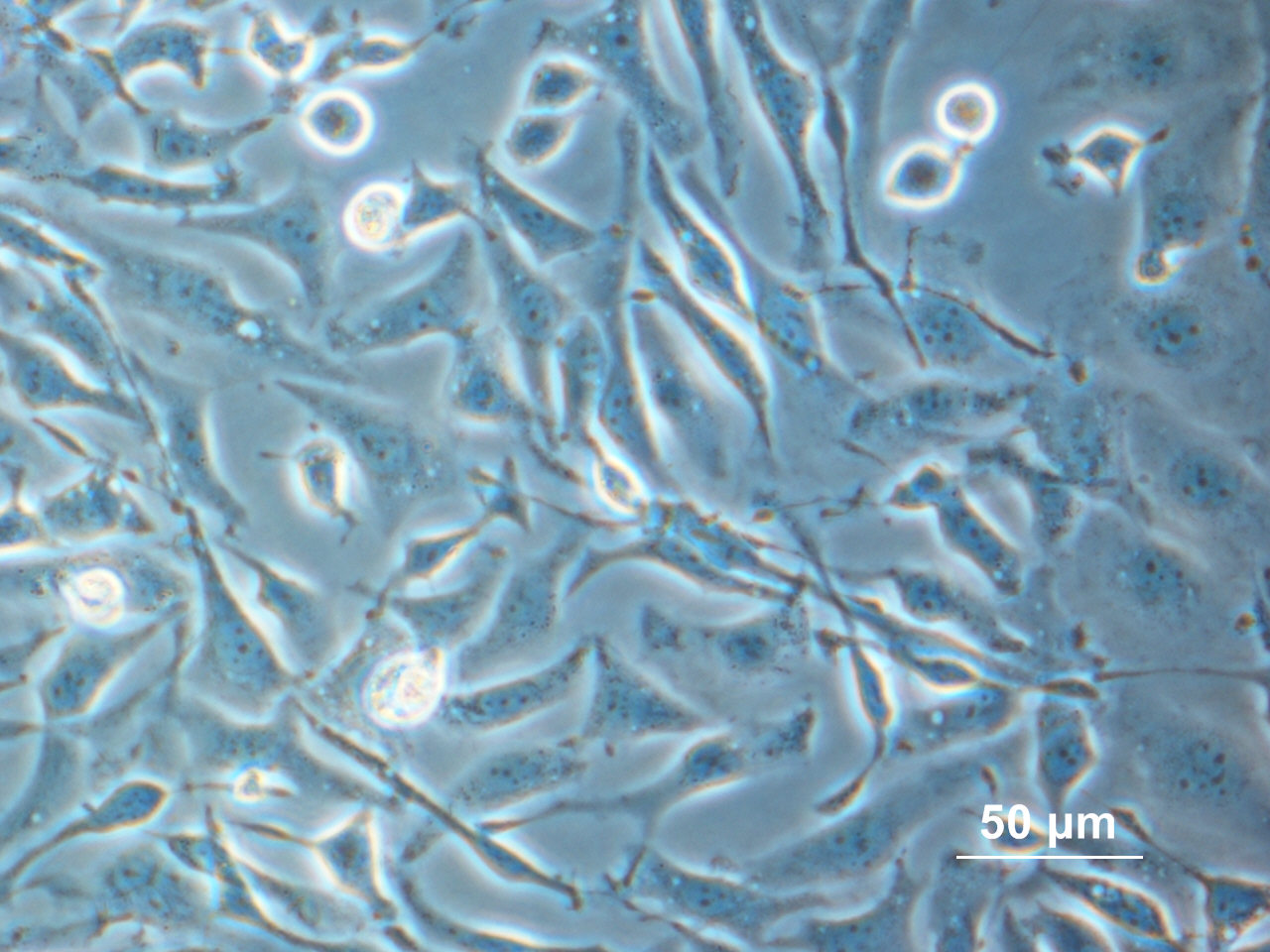
Cultured cells growing in growth medium

In modern usage, "tissue culture" generally refers to the growth of cells from a tissue from a multicellular organism in vitro. These cells may be cells isolated from a donor organism (primary cells) or an immortalised cell line. The cells are bathed in a culture medium, which contains essential nutrients and energy sources necessary for the cells' survival. Thus, in its broader sense, "tissue culture" is often used interchangeably with "cell culture". On the other hand, the strict meaning of "tissue culture" refers to the culturing of tissue pieces, i.e. explant culture.

Tissue culture is an important tool for the study of the biology of cells from multicellular organisms. It provides an in vitro model of the tissue in a well defined environment which can be easily manipulated and analysed. In animal tissue culture, cells may be grown as two-dimensional monolayers (conventional culture) or within fibrous scaffolds or gels to attain more naturalistic three-dimensional tissue-like structures (3D culture). A 1988 NIH SBIR grant report showed that electrospinning could be used to produce nano- and submicron-scale polymeric fibrous scaffolds specifically intended for use as in vitro cell and tissue substrates. This early use of electrospun fibrous lattices for cell culture and tissue engineering showed that various cell types would adhere to and proliferate upon polycarbonate fibers. It was noted that as opposed to the flattened morphology typically seen in 2D culture, cells grown on the electrospun fibers exhibited a more rounded 3-dimensional morphology generally observed of tissues in vivo.

Plant tissue culture in particular is concerned with the growing of entire plants from small pieces of plant tissue, cultured in medium.

== Concepts in mammalian cell culture ==
=== Isolation of cells ===
Cells can be isolated from tissues for ex vivo culture in several ways. Cells can be easily purified from blood; however, only the white cells are capable of growth in culture. Cells can be isolated from solid tissues by digesting the extracellular matrix using enzymes such as collagenase, trypsin, or pronase, before agitating the tissue to release the cells into suspension. Alternatively, pieces of tissue can be placed in growth media, and the cells that grow out are available for culture. This method is known as explant culture.

Cells that are cultured directly from a subject are known as primary cells. With the exception of some derived from tumors, most primary cell cultures have limited lifespan.

An established or immortalized cell line has acquired the ability to proliferate indefinitely either through random mutation or deliberate modification, such as artificial expression of the telomerase gene. Numerous cell lines are well established as representative of particular cell types.

=== Maintaining cells in culture ===
For the majority of isolated primary cells, they undergo the process of senescence and stop dividing after a certain number of population doublings while generally retaining their viability (described as the Hayflick limit).

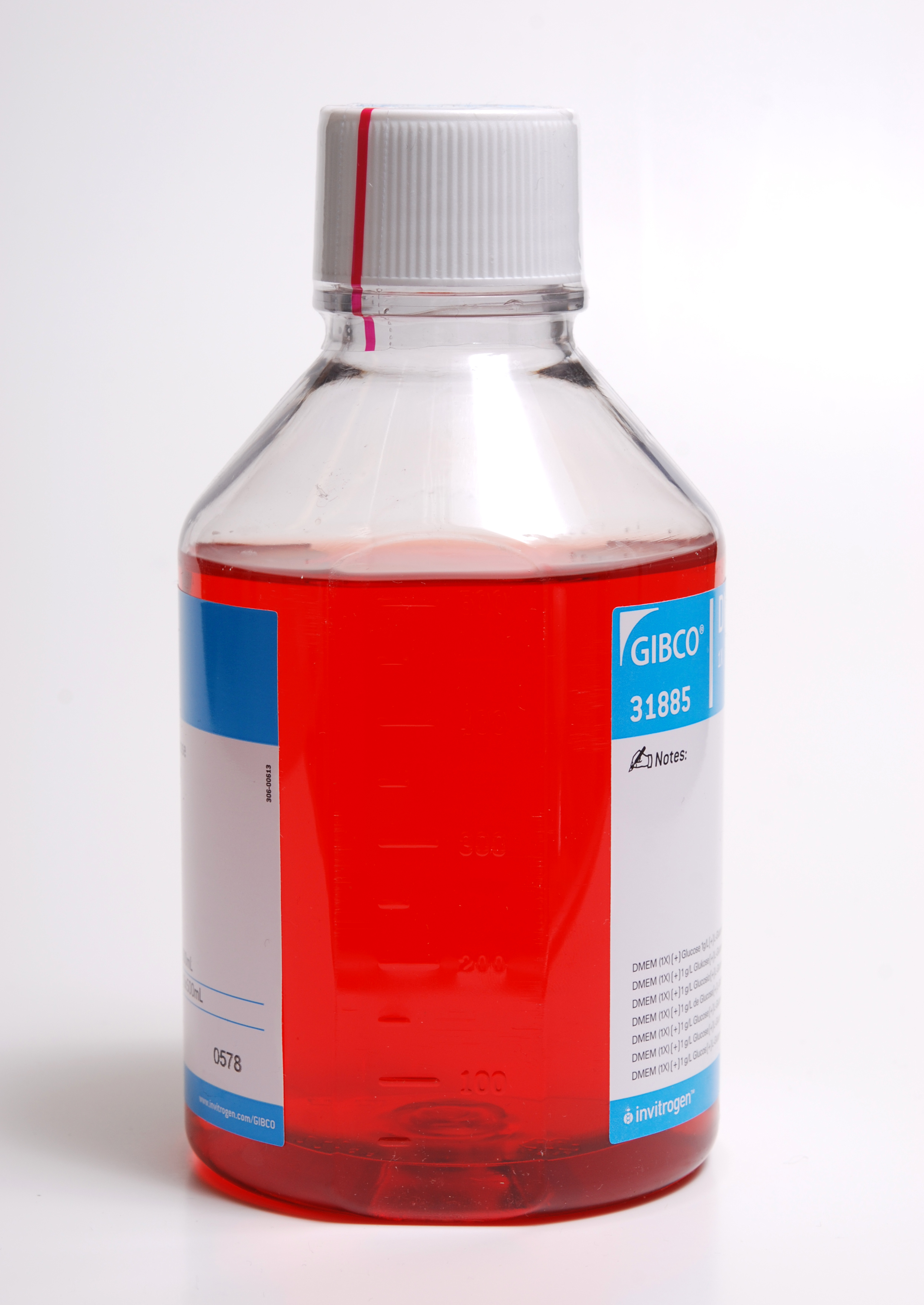
A bottle of DMEM cell culture medium

Aside from temperature and gas mixture, the most commonly varied factor in culture systems is the cell growth medium. Recipes for growth media can vary in pH, glucose concentration, growth factors, and the presence of other nutrients. The growth factors used to supplement media are often derived from the serum of animal blood, such as fetal bovine serum (FBS), bovine calf serum, equine serum, and porcine serum. One complication of these blood-derived ingredients is the potential for contamination of the culture with viruses or prions, particularly in medical biotechnology applications. Current practice is to minimize or eliminate the use of these ingredients wherever possible and use human platelet lysate (hPL). This eliminates the worry of cross-species contamination when using FBS with human cells. hPL has emerged as a safe and reliable alternative as a direct replacement for FBS or other animal serum. In addition, chemically defined media can be used to eliminate any serum trace (human or animal), but this cannot always be accomplished with different cell types. Alternative strategies involve sourcing the animal blood from countries with minimum BSE/TSE risk, such as The United States, Australia and New Zealand, and using purified nutrient concentrates derived from serum in place of whole animal serum for cell culture.

Plating density (number of cells per volume of culture medium) plays a critical role for some cell types. For example, a lower plating density makes granulosa cells exhibit estrogen production, while a higher plating density makes them appear as progesterone-producing theca lutein cells.

Cells can be grown either in suspension or adherent cultures. Some cells naturally live in suspension, without being attached to a surface, such as cells that exist in the bloodstream. There are also cell lines that have been modified to be able to survive in suspension cultures so they can be grown to a higher density than adherent conditions would allow. Adherent cells require a surface, such as tissue culture plastic or microcarrier, which may be coated with extracellular matrix (such as collagen and laminin) components to increase adhesion properties and provide other signals needed for growth and differentiation. Most cells derived from solid tissues are adherent. Another type of adherent culture is organotypic culture, which involves growing cells in a three-dimensional (3-D) environment as opposed to two-dimensional culture dishes. This 3D culture system is biochemically and physiologically more similar to in vivo tissue, but is technically challenging to maintain because of many factors (e.g. diffusion).

==== Cell culture basal media ====
There are different kinds of cell culture media which being used routinely in life science including the following:

- MEM
- DMEM
- RPMI 1640
- Ham's f-12
- IMDM
- Leibovitz L-15
- DMEM/F-12
- GMEM

=== Components of cell culture media ===
| Component | Function |
|---|---|
| Carbon source (glucose/glutamine) | Source of energy |
| Amino acid | Building blocks of protein |
| Vitamins | Promote cell survival and growth |
| Balanced salt solution | An isotonic mixture of ions to maintain optimum osmotic pressure within the cells and provide essential metal ions to act as cofactors for enzymatic reactions, cell adhesion etc. |
| Phenol red dye | pH indicator. The color of phenol red changes from orange/red at pH 7–7.4 to yellow at acidic (lower) pH and purple at basic (higher) pH. |
| Bicarbonate /HEPES buffer | It is used to maintain a balanced pH in the media |

==== Typical Growth conditions ====
| Parameter | |
|---|---|
| Temperature | 37 °C |
| CO2 | 5% |
| Relative Humidity | 95% |

=== Cell line cross-contamination ===
Cell line cross-contamination can be a problem for scientists working with cultured cells. Studies suggest anywhere from 15 to 20% of the time, cells used in experiments have been misidentified or contaminated with another cell line. Problems with cell line cross-contamination have even been detected in lines from the NCI-60 panel, which are used routinely for drug-screening studies. Major cell line repositories, including the American Type Culture Collection (ATCC), the European Collection of Cell Cultures (ECACC) and the German Collection of Microorganisms and Cell Cultures (DSMZ), have received cell line submissions from researchers that were misidentified by them. Such contamination poses a problem for the quality of research produced using cell culture lines, and the major repositories are now authenticating all cell line submissions. ATCC uses short tandem repeat (STR) DNA fingerprinting to authenticate its cell lines.

To address this problem of cell line cross-contamination, researchers are encouraged to authenticate their cell lines at an early passage to establish the identity of the cell line. Authentication should be repeated before freezing cell line stocks, every two months during active culturing and before any publication of research data generated using the cell lines. Many methods are used to identify cell lines, including isoenzyme analysis, human lymphocyte antigen (HLA) typing, chromosomal analysis, karyotyping, morphology and STR analysis.

One significant cell-line cross contaminant is the immortal HeLa cell line. HeLa contamination was first noted in the early 1960s in non-human culture in the USA. Intraspecies contamination was discovered in nineteen cell lines in the seventies. In 1974, five human cell lines from the Soviet Union were found to be HeLa. A follow-up study analysing 50-odd cell lines indicated that half had HeLa markers, but contaminant HeLa had hybridised with the original cell lines. HeLa cell contamination from air droplets has been reported. HeLa was even unknowingly injected into human subjects by Jonas Salk in a 1978 vaccine trial.

=== Other technical issues ===
As cells generally continue to divide in culture, they generally grow to fill the available area or volume. This can generate several issues:

- Nutrient depletion in the growth media
- Changes in pH of the growth media
- Accumulation of apoptotic/necrotic (dead) cells
- Cell-to-cell contact can stimulate cell cycle arrest, causing cells to stop dividing, known as contact inhibition.
- Cell-to-cell contact can stimulate cellular differentiation.
- Genetic and epigenetic alterations, with a natural selection of the altered cells potentially leading to overgrowth of abnormal, culture-adapted cells with decreased differentiation and increased proliferative capacity.

The choice of culture medium might affect the physiological relevance of findings from cell culture experiments due to the differences in the nutrient composition and concentrations. A systematic bias in generated datasets was recently shown for CRISPR and RNAi gene silencing screens, and for metabolic profiling of cancer cell lines. Using a growth medium that better represents the physiological levels of nutrients can improve the physiological relevance of in vitro studies and recently such media types, as Plasmax and Human Plasma Like Medium (HPLM), were developed.

=== Manipulation of cultured cells ===
Among the common manipulations carried out on culture cells are media changes, passaging cells, and transfecting cells. These are generally performed using tissue culture methods that rely on aseptic technique. Aseptic technique aims to avoid contamination with bacteria, yeast, or other cell lines. Manipulations are typically carried out in a biosafety cabinet or laminar flow cabinet to exclude contaminating micro-organisms. Antibiotics (e.g. penicillin and streptomycin) and antifungals (e.g.amphotericin B and Antibiotic-Antimycotic solution) can also be added to the growth media.

As cells undergo metabolic processes, acid is produced and the pH decreases. Often, a pH indicator is added to the medium to measure nutrient depletion.

==== Media changes ====
In the case of adherent cultures, the media can be removed directly by aspiration, and then is replaced. Media changes in non-adherent cultures involve centrifuging the culture and resuspending the cells in fresh media.

==== Passaging cells ====
Passaging (also known as subculture or splitting cells) involves transferring a small number of cells into a new vessel. Cells can be cultured for a longer time if they are split regularly, as it avoids the senescence associated with prolonged high cell density. Suspension cultures are easily passaged with a small amount of culture containing a few cells diluted in a larger volume of fresh media. For adherent cultures, cells first need to be detached; this is commonly done with a mixture of trypsin-EDTA; however, other enzyme mixes are now available for this purpose. A small number of detached cells can then be used to seed a new culture. Some cell cultures, such as RAW cells are mechanically scraped from the surface of their vessel with rubber scrapers.

==== Transfection and transduction ====
Another common method for manipulating cells involves the introduction of foreign DNA by transfection. This is often performed to cause cells to express a gene of interest. More recently, the transfection of RNAi constructs have been realized as a convenient mechanism for suppressing the expression of a particular gene/protein. DNA can also be inserted into cells using viruses, in methods referred to as transduction, infection or transformation. Viruses, as parasitic agents, are well suited to introducing DNA into cells, as this is a part of their normal course of reproduction.

=== Established human cell lines ===
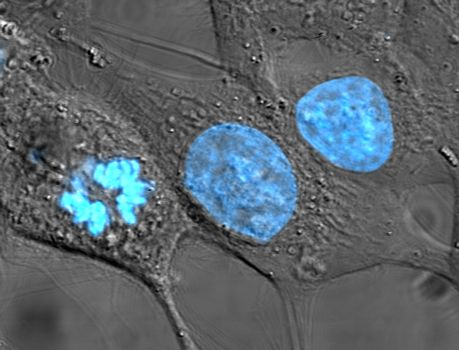
Cultured HeLa cells have been stained with Hoechst turning their nuclei blue, and are one of the earliest human cell lines descended from Henrietta Lacks, who died of cervical cancer from which these cells originated.

Cell lines that originate with humans have been somewhat controversial in bioethics, as they may outlive their parent organism and later be used in the discovery of lucrative medical treatments. In the pioneering decision in this area, the Supreme Court of California held in Moore v. Regents of the University of California that human patients have no property rights in cell lines derived from organs removed with their consent.

It is possible to fuse normal cells with an immortalised cell line. This method is used to produce monoclonal antibodies. In brief, lymphocytes isolated from the spleen (or possibly blood) of an immunised animal are combined with an immortal myeloma cell line (B cell lineage) to produce a hybridoma which has the antibody specificity of the primary lymphocyte and the immortality of the myeloma. Selective growth medium (HA or HAT) is used to select against unfused myeloma cells; primary lymphoctyes die quickly in culture and only the fused cells survive. These are screened for production of the required antibody, generally in pools to start with and then after single cloning.

=== Cell strains ===
A cell strain is derived either from a primary culture or a cell line by the selection or cloning of cells having specific properties or characteristics which must be defined. Cell strains are cells that have been adapted to culture but, unlike cell lines, have a finite division potential. Non-immortalized cells stop dividing after 40 to 60 population doublings and, after this, they lose their ability to proliferate (a genetically determined event known as senescence).

== Applications of cell culture ==
Mass culture of animal cell lines is fundamental to the manufacture of viral vaccines and other products of biotechnology. Culture of human stem cells is used to expand the number of cells and differentiate the cells into various somatic cell types for transplantation. Stem cell culture is also used to harvest the molecules and exosomes that the stem cells release for the purposes of therapeutic development.

Biological products produced by recombinant DNA (rDNA) technology in animal cell cultures include enzymes, synthetic hormones, immunobiologicals (monoclonal antibodies, interleukins, lymphokines), and anticancer agents. Although many simpler proteins can be produced using rDNA in bacterial cultures, more complex proteins that are glycosylated (carbohydrate-modified) currently must be made in animal cells. Mammalian cells ensure expressed proteins are folded correctly and possess human-like glycosylation and post-translational modifications. An important example of such a complex protein is the hormone erythropoietin. The cost of growing mammalian cell cultures is high, so research is underway to produce such complex proteins in insect cells or in higher plants, use of single embryonic cell and somatic embryos as a source for direct gene transfer via particle bombardment, transit gene expression and confocal microscopy observation is one of its applications. It also offers to confirm single cell origin of somatic embryos and the asymmetry of the first cell division, which starts the process.

Cell culture is also a key technique for cellular agriculture, which aims to provide both new products and new ways of producing existing agricultural products like milk, (cultured) meat, fragrances, and rhino horn from cells and microorganisms. It is therefore considered one means of achieving animal-free agriculture. It is also a central tool for teaching cell biology.

=== Cell culture in two dimensions ===
Research in tissue engineering, stem cells and molecular biology primarily involves cultures of cells on flat plastic dishes. This technique is known as two-dimensional (2D) cell culture, and was first developed by Wilhelm Roux who, in 1885, removed a portion of the medullary plate of an embryonic chicken and maintained it in warm saline for several days on a flat glass plate. From the advance of polymer technology arose today's standard plastic dish for 2D cell culture, commonly known as the Petri dish. Julius Richard Petri, a German bacteriologist, is generally credited with this invention while working as an assistant to Robert Koch. Various researchers today also utilize culturing laboratory flasks, conicals, and even disposable bags like those used in single-use bioreactors.

Aside from Petri dishes, scientists have long been growing cells within biologically derived matrices such as collagen or fibrin, and more recently, on synthetic hydrogels such as polyacrylamide or PEG. They do this in order to elicit phenotypes that are not expressed on conventionally rigid substrates. There is growing interest in controlling matrix stiffness, a concept that has led to discoveries in fields such as:

- Stem cell self-renewal
- Lineage specification
- Cancer cell phenotype
- Fibrosis
- Hepatocyte function
- Mechanosensing

=== Cell culture in three dimensions ===
Cell culture in three dimensions has been touted as "Biology's New Dimension". At present, the practice of cell culture remains based on varying combinations of single or multiple cell structures in 2D. Currently, there is an increase in use of 3D cell cultures in research areas including drug discovery, cancer biology, regenerative medicine, nanomaterials assessment and basic life science research. 3D cell cultures can be grown using a scaffold or matrix, or in a scaffold-free manner. Scaffold based cultures utilize an acellular 3D matrix or a liquid matrix. Scaffold-free methods are normally generated in suspensions. There are a variety of platforms used to facilitate the growth of three-dimensional cellular structures including scaffold systems such as hydrogel matrices and solid scaffolds, and scaffold-free systems such as low-adhesion plates, nanoparticle facilitated magnetic levitation, hanging drop plates, and rotary cell culture. Culturing cells in 3D leads to wide variation in gene expression signatures and partly mimics tissues in the physiological states. A 3D cell culture model showed cell growth similar to that of in vivo than did a monolayer culture, and all three cultures were capable of sustaining cell growth. As 3D culturing has been developed it turns out to have a great potential to design tumors models and investigate malignant transformation and metastasis, 3D cultures can provide aggerate tool for understanding changes, interactions, and cellular signaling.

==== 3D cell culture in scaffolds ====
Eric Simon, in a 1988 NIH SBIR grant report, showed that electrospinning could be used to produce nano- and submicron-scale polystyrene and polycarbonate fibrous scaffolds specifically intended for use as in vitro cell substrates. This early use of electrospun fibrous lattices for cell culture and tissue engineering showed that various cell types including Human Foreskin Fibroblasts (HFF), transformed Human Carcinoma (HEp-2), and Mink Lung Epithelium (MLE) would adhere to and proliferate upon polycarbonate fibers. It was noted that, as opposed to the flattened morphology typically seen in 2D culture, cells grown on the electrospun fibers exhibited a more histotypic rounded 3-dimensional morphology generally observed in vivo.

==== 3D cell culture in hydrogels ====
As the natural extracellular matrix (ECM) is important in the survival, proliferation, differentiation and migration of cells, different hydrogel culture matrices mimicking natural ECM structure are seen as potential approaches to in vivo–like cell culturing. Hydrogels are composed of interconnected pores with high water retention, which enables efficient transport of substances such as nutrients and gases. Several different types of hydrogels from natural and synthetic materials are available for 3D cell culture, including animal ECM extract hydrogels, protein hydrogels, peptide hydrogels, polymer hydrogels, and wood-based nanocellulose hydrogel.

==== 3D Cell Culturing by Magnetic Levitation ====
The 3D Cell Culturing by Magnetic Levitation method (MLM) is the application of growing 3D tissue by inducing cells treated with magnetic nanoparticle assemblies in spatially varying magnetic fields using neodymium magnetic drivers and promoting cell to cell interactions by levitating the cells up to the air/liquid interface of a standard petri dish. The magnetic nanoparticle assemblies consist of magnetic iron oxide nanoparticles, gold nanoparticles, and the polymer polylysine. 3D cell culturing is scalable, with the capability for culturing 500 cells to millions of cells or from single dish to high-throughput low volume systems.

=== Tissue culture and engineering ===
Cell culture is a fundamental component of tissue culture and tissue engineering, as it establishes the basics of growing and maintaining cells in vitro. The major application of human cell culture is in stem cell industry, where mesenchymal stem cells are isolated, cultured, and subjected to long-term storage via optimized cryopreservation, so as to retain stable differentiation and immunomodulatory properties post-thaw for future applications. Tissue engineering potentially offers dramatic improvements in low cost medical care for hundreds of thousands of patients annually.

=== Vaccines ===
Vaccines for polio, measles, mumps, rubella, and chickenpox are currently made in cell cultures. Due to the H5N1 pandemic threat, research into using cell culture for influenza vaccines is being funded by the United States government. Novel ideas in the field include recombinant DNA-based vaccines, such as one made using human adenovirus (a common cold virus) as a vector, and novel adjuvants.

=== Cell co-culture ===
The technique of co-culturing is used to study cell crosstalk between two or more types of cells on a plate or in a 3D matrix. The cultivation of different stem cells and the interaction of immune cells can be investigated in an in vitro model similar to biological tissue. Since most tissues contain more than one type of cell, it is important to evaluate their interaction in a 3D culture environment to gain a better understanding of their interaction and to introduce mimetic tissues. There are two types of co-culturing: direct and indirect. While direct interaction involves cells being in direct contact with each other in the same culture media or matrix, indirect interaction involves different environments, allowing signaling and soluble factors to participate.

Cell differentiation in tissue models during interaction between cells can be studied using the Co-Cultured System to simulate cancer tumors, to assess the effect of drugs on therapeutic trials, and to study the effect of drugs on therapeutic trials. The co-culture system in 3D models can predict the response to chemotherapy and endocrine therapy if the microenvironment defines biological tissue for the cells.

A co-culture method is used in tissue engineering to generate tissue formation with multiple cells interacting directly.

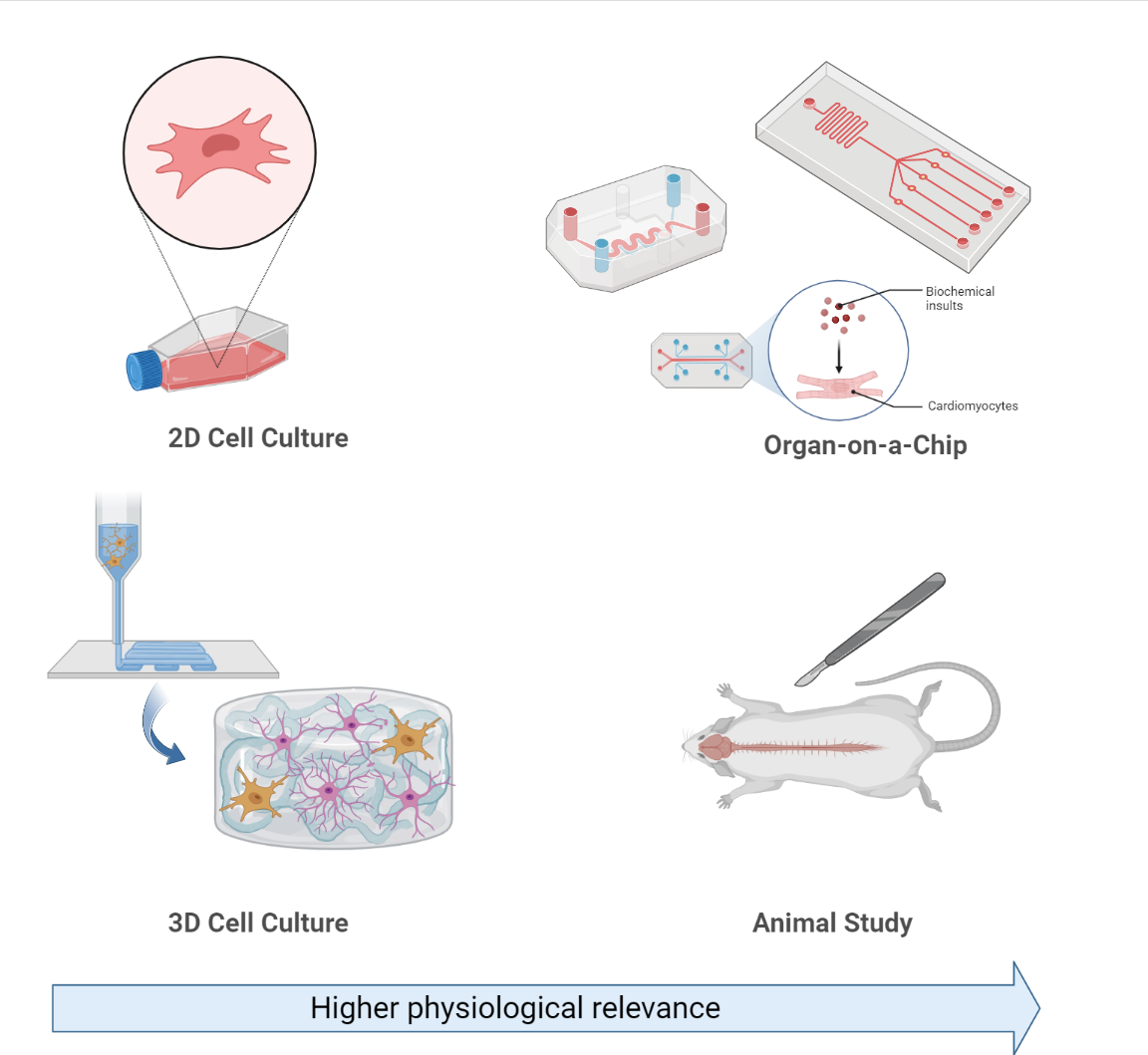
Schematic representation of 2D culture, 3D culture, organ-on-a-chip and in vivo study

=== Cell culture in microfluidic device ===
Microfluidics technique is developed systems that can perform a process in a flow which are usually in a scale of micron. Microfluidics chip are also known as Lab-on-a-chip and they are able to have continuous procedure and reaction steps with spare amount of reactants and space. Such systems enable the identification and isolation of individual cells and molecules when combined with appropriate biological assays and high-sensitivity detection techniques.

=== Organ-on-a-chip ===
OoC systems mimic and control the microenvironment of the cells by growing tissues in microfluidics. Combining tissue engineering, biomaterials fabrication, and cell biology, it offers the possibility of establishing a biomimetic model for studying human diseases in the laboratory. In recent years, 3D cell culture science has made significant progress, leading to the development of OoC. OoC is considered as a preclinical step that benefits pharmaceutical studies, drug development and disease modeling. OoC is an important technology that can bridge the gap between animal testing and clinical studies and also by the advances that the science has achieved could be a replace for in vivo studies for drug delivery and pathophysiological studies.

== Culture of non-mammalian cells ==
Besides the culture of well-established immortalised cell lines, cells from primary explants of a plethora of organisms can be cultured for a limited period of time before senescence occurs (see Hayflick's limit). Cultured primary cells have been extensively used in research, as is the case of fish keratocytes in cell migration studies.

=== Plant cell culture methods ===
Plant cell cultures are typically grown as cell suspension cultures in a liquid medium or as callus cultures on a solid medium. The culturing of undifferentiated plant cells and calli requires the proper balance of the plant growth hormones auxin and cytokinin.

=== Insect cell culture ===
Cells derived from Drosophila melanogaster (most prominently, Schneider 2 cells) can be used for experiments which may be hard to do on live flies or larvae, such as biochemical studies or studies using siRNA. Cell lines derived from the army worm Spodoptera frugiperda, including Sf9 and Sf21, and from the cabbage looper Trichoplusia ni, High Five cells, are commonly used for expression of recombinant proteins using baculovirus.

=== Bacterial and yeast culture methods ===
For bacteria and yeasts, small quantities of cells are usually grown on a solid support that contains nutrients embedded in it, usually a gel such as agar, while large-scale cultures are grown with the cells suspended in a nutrient broth.

=== Viral culture methods ===
The culture of viruses requires the culture of cells of mammalian, plant, fungal or bacterial origin as hosts for the growth and replication of the virus. Whole wild type viruses, recombinant viruses or viral products may be generated in cell types other than their natural hosts under the right conditions. Depending on the species of the virus, infection and viral replication may result in host cell lysis and formation of a viral plaque.

== Common cell lines ==
Human cell lines

- DU145 (prostate cancer)
- H295R (adrenocortical cancer)
- HeLa (cervical cancer)
- KBM-7 (chronic myelogenous leukemia)
- LNCaP (prostate cancer)
- MCF-7 (breast cancer)
- MDA-MB-468 (breast cancer)
- PC3 (prostate cancer)
- SaOS-2 (bone cancer)
- SH-SY5Y (neuroblastoma, cloned from a myeloma)
- T-47D (breast cancer)
- THP-1 (acute myeloid leukemia)
- U-87 MG (glioblastoma)
- National Cancer Institute's 60 cancer cell line panel (NCI60)

Primate cell lines

- Vero (African green monkey Chlorocebus kidney epithelial cell line)

Mouse cell lines

- MC3T3 (embryonic calvarium)

Rat tumor cell lines

- GH3 (pituitary tumor)
- PC12 (pheochromocytoma)

Other mammal cell lines

- BHK21 cell (Baby Hamster Kidney)
- MDBK cell (Madin-Darby Bovine Kidney)
- DF-1 cell (chicken fibroblast)
- Dog MDCK kidney epithelial

Other vertebrate cell lines

- Xenopus A6 kidney epithelial
- Zebrafish AB9 fin fibroblast

Plant cell lines

- Tobacco BY-2 cells (kept as cell suspension culture, they are model system of plant cell)
- Nicotiana tabaccum cv. Virginia Bright Italia 0 (VBI-0) cells, suspension culture
- Arabidopsis thaliana, ecotype Columbia (Col) cells, suspension culture
- Arabidopsis thaliana, ecotype Landsberg erecta (Ler) cells, suspension culture

== List of cell lines ==
| Cell line | Meaning | Organism | Origin tissue | Morphology | Links |
|---|---|---|---|---|---|
| 3T3-L1 | "3-day transfer, inoculum 3 × 10^{5} cells" | Mouse | Embryo | Fibroblast | ECACC Cellosaurus |
| 4T1 | | Mouse | Mammary gland | | ATCC Cellosaurus |
| 1321N1 | | Human | Brain | Astrocytoma | ECACC Cellosaurus |
| 9L | | Rat | Brain | Glioblastoma | ECACC Cellosaurus |
| A172 | | Human | Brain | Glioblastoma | ECACC Cellosaurus |
| A20 | | Mouse | B lymphoma | B lymphocyte | Cellosaurus |
| A253 | | Human | Submandibular duct | Head and neck carcinoma | ATCC Cellosaurus |
| A2780 | | Human | Ovary | Ovarian carcinoma | ECACC Cellosaurus |
| A2780ADR | | Human | Ovary | Adriamycin-resistant derivative of A2780 | ECACC Cellosaurus |
| A2780cis | | Human | Ovary | Cisplatin-resistant derivative of A2780 | ECACC Cellosaurus |
| A431 | | Human | Skin epithelium | Squamous cell carcinoma | ECACC Cellosaurus |
| A549 | | Human | Lung | Lung carcinoma | ECACC Cellosaurus |
| AB9 | | Zebrafish | Fin | Fibroblast | ATCC Cellosaurus |
| AHL-1 | Armenian Hamster Lung-1 | Hamster | Lung | | ECACC Cellosaurus |
| ALC | | Mouse | Bone marrow | Stroma | PMID 2435412 Cellosaurus |
| B16 | | Mouse | Melanoma | | ECACC Cellosaurus |
| B35 | | Rat | Neuroblastoma | | ATCC Cellosaurus |
| BCP-1 | | Human | PBMC | HIV+ primary effusion lymphoma | ATCC Cellosaurus |
| BEAS-2B | Bronchial epithelium + Adenovirus 12-SV40 virus hybrid (Ad12SV40) | Human | Lung | Epithelial | ECACC Cellosaurus |
| bEnd.3 | Brain Endothelial 3 | Mouse | Brain/cerebral cortex | Endothelium | Cellosaurus |
| BHK-21 | Baby Hamster Kidney-21 | Hamster | Kidney | Fibroblast | ECACC Cellosaurus |
| BOSC23 | Packaging cell line derived from HEK 293 | Human | Kidney (embryonic) | Epithelium | Cellosaurus |
| BT-20 | Breast Tumor-20 | Human | Breast epithelium | Breast carcinoma | ATCC Cellosaurus |
| BxPC-3 | Biopsy xenograft of Pancreatic Carcinoma line 3 | Human | Pancreatic adenocarcinoma | Epithelial | ECACC Cellosaurus |
| C2C12 | | Mouse | Myoblast | | ECACC Cellosaurus |
| C3H-10T1/2 | | Mouse | Embryonic mesenchymal cell line | | ECACC Cellosaurus |
| C6 | | Rat | Brain astrocyte | Glioma | ECACC Cellosaurus |
| C6/36 | | Insect - Asian tiger mosquito | Larval tissue | | ECACC Cellosaurus |
| Caco-2 | | Human | Colon | Colorectal carcinoma | ECACC Cellosaurus |
| Cal-27 | | Human | Tongue | Squamous cell carcinoma | ATCC Cellosaurus |
| Calu-3 | | Human | Lung | Adenocarcinoma | ATCC Cellosaurus |
| CGR8 | | Mouse | Embryonic stem cells | | ECACC Cellosaurus |
| CHO | Chinese Hamster Ovary | Hamster | Ovary | Epithelium | ECACC Cellosaurus |
| CML T1 | Chronic myeloid leukemia T lymphocyte 1 | Human | CML acute phase | T cell leukemia | DSMZ Cellosaurus |
| CMT12 | Canine Mammary Tumor 12 | Dog | Mammary gland | Epithelium | Cellosaurus |
| COR-L23 | | Human | Lung | Lung carcinoma | ECACC Cellosaurus |
| COR-L23/5010 | | Human | Lung | Lung carcinoma | ECACC Cellosaurus |
| COR-L23/CPR | | Human | Lung | Lung carcinoma | ECACC Cellosaurus |
| COR-L23/R23- | | Human | Lung | Lung carcinoma | ECACC Cellosaurus |
| COS-7 | Cercopithecus aethiops, origin-defective SV-40 | Old World monkey - Cercopithecus aethiops (Chlorocebus) | Kidney | Fibroblast | ECACC Cellosaurus |
| COV-434 | | Human | Ovary | Ovarian granulosa cell carcinoma | PMID 8436435 ECACC Cellosaurus |
| CT26 | | Mouse | Colon | Colorectal carcinoma | Cellosaurus |
| D17 | | Dog | Lung metastasis | Osteosarcoma | ATCC Cellosaurus |
| DAOY | | Human | Brain | Medulloblastoma | ATCC Cellosaurus |
| DH82 | | Dog | Histiocytosis | Monocyte/macrophage | ECACC Cellosaurus |
| DU145 | | Human | Androgen insensitive prostate carcinoma | | ATCC Cellosaurus |
| DuCaP | Dura mater cancer of the Prostate | Human | Metastatic prostate carcinoma | Epithelial | PMID 11317521 Cellosaurus |
| E14Tg2a | | Mouse | | Embryonic stem cells | ECACC Cellosaurus |
| EL4 | | Mouse | | T cell leukemia | ECACC Cellosaurus |
| EM-2 | | Human | CML blast crisis | Ph+ CML line | DSMZ Cellosaurus |
| EM-3 | | Human | CML blast crisis | Ph+ CML line | DSMZ Cellosaurus |
| EMT6/AR1 | | Mouse | Mammary gland | Epithelial-like | ECACC Cellosaurus |
| EMT6/AR10.0 | | Mouse | Mammary gland | Epithelial-like | ECACC Cellosaurus |
| FM3 | | Human | Lymph node metastasis | Melanoma | ECACC Cellosaurus |
| GL261 | Glioma 261 | Mouse | Brain | Glioma | Cellosaurus |
| H1299 | | Human | Lung | Lung carcinoma | ATCC Cellosaurus |
| HaCaT | | Human | Skin | Keratinocyte | CLS Cellosaurus |
| HCA2 | | Human | Colon | Adenocarcinoma | ECACC Cellosaurus |
| HEK 293 | Human Embryonic Kidney 293 | Human | Kidney (embryonic) | Epithelium | ECACC Cellosaurus |
| HEK 293T | HEK 293 derivative | Human | Kidney (embryonic) | Epithelium | ECACC Cellosaurus |
| HeLa | "Henrietta Lacks" | Human | Cervix epithelium | Cervical carcinoma | ECACC Cellosaurus |
| Hepa1c1c7 | Clone 7 of clone 1 hepatoma line 1 | Mouse | Hepatoma | Epithelial | ECACC Cellosaurus |
| Hep G2 | | Human | Liver | Hepatoblastoma | ECACC Cellosaurus |
| High Five | | Insect (moth) - Trichoplusia ni | Ovary | | Cellosaurus |
| HL-60 | Human Leukemia-60 | Human | Blood | Myeloblast | ECACC Cellosaurus |
| HT-1080 | | Human | | Fibrosarcoma | ECACC Cellosaurus |
| HT-29 | | Human | Colon epithelium | Adenocarcinoma | ECACC Cellosaurus |
| J558L | | Mouse | Myeloma | B lymphocyte cell | ECACC Cellosaurus |
| Jurkat | | Human | White blood cells | T cell leukemia | ECACC Cellosaurus |
| JY | | Human | Lymphoblastoid | EBV-transformed B cell | ECACC Cellosaurus |
| K562 | | Human | Lymphoblastoid | CML blast crisis | ECACC Cellosaurus |
| KBM-7 | | Human | Lymphoblastoid | CML blast crisis | Cellosaurus |
| KCL-22 | | Human | Lymphoblastoid | CML | DSMZ Cellosaurus |
| KG1 | | Human | Lymphoblastoid | AML | ECACC Cellosaurus |
| Ku812 | | Human | Lymphoblastoid | Erythroleukemia | ECACC Cellosaurus |
| KYO-1 | Kyoto-1 | Human | Lymphoblastoid | CML | DSMZ Cellosaurus |
| L1210 | | Mouse | Lymphocytic leukemia | Ascitic fluid | ECACC Cellosaurus |
| L243 | | Mouse | Hybridoma | Secretes L243 mAb (against HLA-DR) | ATCC Cellosaurus |
| LNCaP | Lymph Node Cancer of the Prostate | Human | Prostatic adenocarcinoma | Epithelial | ECACC Cellosaurus |
| MA-104 | Microbiological Associates-104 | African Green Monkey | Kidney | Epithelial | Cellosaurus |
| MA2.1 | | Mouse | Hybridoma | Secretes MA2.1 mAb (against HLA-A2 and HLA-B17) | ATCC Cellosaurus |
| Ma-Mel 1, 2, 3....48 | | Human | Skin | A range of melanoma cell lines | ECACC Cellosaurus |
| MC-38 | Mouse Colon-38 | Mouse | Colon | Adenocarcinoma | Cellosaurus |
| MCF-7 | Michigan Cancer Foundation-7 | Human | Breast | Invasive breast ductal carcinoma ER+, PR+ | ECACC Cellosaurus |
| MCF-10A | Michigan Cancer Foundation-10A | Human | Breast epithelium | | ATCC Cellosaurus |
| MDA-MB-157 | M.D. Anderson - Metastatic Breast-157 | Human | Pleural effusion metastasis | Breast carcinoma | ECACC Cellosaurus |
| MDA-MB-231 | M.D. Anderson - Metastatic Breast-231 | Human | Pleural effusion metastasis | Breast carcinoma | ECACC Cellosaurus |
| MDA-MB-361 | M.D. Anderson - Metastatic Breast-361 | Human | | Melanoma (contaminated by M14) | ECACC Cellosaurus |
| MDA-MB-468 | M.D. Anderson - Metastatic Breast-468 | Human | Pleural effusion metastasis | Breast carcinoma | ATCC Cellosaurus |
| MDCK II | Madin Darby Canine Kidney II | Dog | Kidney | Epithelium | ECACC Cellosaurus |
| MG63 | | Human | Bone | Osteosarcoma | ECACC Cellosaurus |
| MIA PaCa-2 | | Human | Prostate | Pancreatic Carcinoma | ATCC Cellosaurus |
| MOR/0.2R | | Human | Lung | Lung carcinoma | ECACC Cellosaurus |
| Mono-Mac-6 | | Human | White blood cells | Myeloid metaplasic AML | DSMZ Cellosaurus |
| MRC-5 | Medical Research Council cell strain 5 | Human | Lung (fetal) | Fibroblast | ECACC Cellosaurus |
| MTD-1A | | Mouse | | Epithelium | Cellosaurus |
| MyEnd | Myocardial Endothelial | Mouse | | Endothelium | Cellosaurus |
| NCI-H69 | | Human | Lung | Lung carcinoma | ECACC Cellosaurus |
| NCI-H69/CPR | | Human | Lung | Lung carcinoma | ECACC Cellosaurus |
| NCI-H69/LX10 | | Human | Lung | Lung carcinoma | ECACC Cellosaurus |
| NCI-H69/LX20 | | Human | Lung | Lung carcinoma | ECACC Cellosaurus |
| NCI-H69/LX4 | | Human | Lung | Lung carcinoma | ECACC Cellosaurus |
| Neuro-2a | | Mouse | Nerve/neuroblastoma | Neuronal stem cells | ECACC Cellosaurus |
| NIH-3T3 | NIH, 3-day transfer, inoculum 3 × 10^{5} cells | Mouse | Embryo | Fibroblast | ECACC Cellosaurus |
| NALM-1 | | Human | Peripheral blood | Blast-crisis CML | ATCC Cellosaurus |
| NK-92 | | Human | Leukemia/lymphoma | | ATCC Cellosaurus |
| NTERA-2 | | Human | Lung metastasis | Embryonal carcinoma | ECACC Cellosaurus |
| NW-145 | | Human | Skin | Melanoma | ESTDAB Cellosaurus |
| OK | Opossum Kidney | Virginia opossum - Didelphis virginiana | Kidney | | ECACC Cellosaurus |
| OPCN / OPCT cell lines | | Human | Prostate | Range of prostate tumour lines | Cellosaurus |
| P3X63Ag8 | | Mouse | Myeloma | | ECACC Cellosaurus |
| PANC-1 | | Human | Duct | Epithelioid Carcinoma | ATCC Cellosaurus |
| PC12 | | Rat | Adrenal medulla | Pheochromocytoma | ECACC Cellosaurus |
| PC-3 | Prostate Cancer-3 | Human | Bone metastasis | Prostate carcinoma | ECACC Cellosaurus |
| Peer | | Human | T cell leukemia | | DSMZ Cellosaurus |
| PNT1A | | Human | Prostate | SV40-transformed tumour line | ECACC Cellosaurus |
| PNT2 | | Human | Prostate | SV40-transformed tumour line | ECACC Cellosaurus |
| Pt K2 | The second cell line derived from Potorous tridactylis | Long-nosed potoroo - Potorous tridactylus | Kidney | Epithelial | ECACC Cellosaurus |
| Raji | | Human | B lymphoma | Lymphoblast-like | ECACC Cellosaurus |
| RBL-1 | Rat Basophilic Leukemia-1 | Rat | Leukemia | Basophil cell | ECACC Cellosaurus |
| RenCa | Renal Carcinoma | Mouse | Kidney | Renal carcinoma | ATCC Cellosaurus |
| RIN-5F | | Mouse | Pancreas | | ECACC Cellosaurus |
| RMA-S | | Mouse | | T cell tumour | Cellosaurus |
| S2 | Schneider 2 | Insect - Drosophila melanogaster | Late stage (20–24 hours old) embryos | | ATCC Cellosaurus |
| SaOS-2 | Sarcoma OSteogenic-2 | Human | Bone | Osteosarcoma | ECACC Cellosaurus |
| Sf21 | Spodoptera frugiperda 21 | Insect (moth) - Spodoptera frugiperda | Ovary | | ECACC Cellosaurus |
| Sf9 | Spodoptera frugiperda 9 | Insect (moth) - Spodoptera frugiperda | Ovary | | ECACC Cellosaurus |
| SH-SY5Y | | Human | Bone marrow metastasis | Neuroblastoma | ECACC Cellosaurus |
| SiHa | | Human | Cervix epithelium | Cervical carcinoma | ATCC Cellosaurus |
| SK-BR-3 | Sloan-Kettering Breast cancer 3 | Human | Breast | Breast carcinoma | DSMZ Cellosaurus |
| SK-OV-3 | Sloan-Kettering Ovarian cancer 3 | Human | Ovary | Ovarian carcinoma | ECACC Cellosaurus |
| SK-N-SH | | Human | Brain | Epithelial | ATCC Cellosaurus |
| T2 | | Human | | T cell leukemia/B cell line hybridoma | ATCC Cellosaurus |
| T-47D | | Human | Breast | Breast ductal carcinoma | ECACC Cellosaurus |
| T84 | | Human | Lung metastasis | Colorectal carcinoma | ECACC Cellosaurus |
| T98G | | Human | Glioblastoma-astrocytoma | Epithelium | ECACC Cellosaurus |
| THP-1 | | Human | Monocyte | Acute monocytic leukemia | ECACC Cellosaurus |
| U2OS | | Human | Osteosarcoma | Epithelial | ECACC Cellosaurus |
| U373 | | Human | Glioblastoma-astrocytoma | Epithelium | ECACC Cellosaurus |
| U87 | | Human | Glioblastoma-astrocytoma | Epithelial-like | ECACC Cellosaurus |
| U937 | | Human | Leukemic monocytic lymphoma | | ECACC Cellosaurus |
| VCaP | Vertebral Cancer of the Prostate | Human | Vertebra metastasis | Prostate carcinoma | ECACC Cellosaurus |
| Vero | From Esperanto: verda (green, for green monkey) reno (kidney) | African green monkey - Chlorocebus sabaeus | Kidney epithelium | | ECACC Cellosaurus |
| VG-1 | | Human | | Primary effusion lymphoma | Cellosaurus |
| WM39 | | Human | Skin | Melanoma | ESTDAB Cellosaurus |
| WT-49 | | Human | Lymphoblastoid | | ECACC Cellosaurus |
| YAC-1 | | Mouse | Lymphoma | | ECACC Cellosaurus |
| YAR | | Human | Lymphoblastoid | EBV-transformed B cell | Human Immunology ECACC Cellosaurus |

== See also ==
- Biological immortality
- Cell culture assays
- Electric cell-substrate impedance sensing
- List of contaminated cell lines
- List of NCI-60 Cell Lines
- List of LL-100 panel Cell Lines
- List of breast cancer cell lines
- Microphysiometry
