= DAOY =

DAOY may refer to:

- DAOY (biology)
- El Bayadh Airport, airport code in Algeria
