= T47 =

T47 may refer to:

- T47 (classification), a disability sport classification
- Cessna T-47, an American trainer aircraft
- Slingsby T.47, a British glider
- T-47 airspeeder, a fictional vehicle in the Star Wars franchise
- T 47-class destroyer of the French Navy
- WNJU, a television station serving New York City
- T-47D, a cell line
