= Sf9 =

Sf9 may refer to:

- Sf9 (cells), a cell line
- SF9, a South Korean boy band
