= JY =

JY or Jy may refer to:

== People ==
- Jimmy Young (broadcaster) (1921–2016), BBC radio broadcaster
- James Young (American musician) (born 1949), guitarist for Styx
- Joey Yung (born 1980), Hong Kong cantopop singer
- Kang Ji-young (born 1994), South Korean actress and singer

== Other uses ==
- Air Turks and Caicos, IATA airline designator JY
- Jansky (symbol Jy), a non-SI unit of spectral flux density
- Japanese yen, a currency unit
- Jia Yu Channel, a 24-hour Mandarin subscription channel founded in Malaysia
- Jesus Youth (symbol Jy), an international missionary movement at the service of the Catholic Church
- , symbol for the Yamanote Line, a loop line operated by the East Japan Railway Company.
- JY cell line, Epstein-Barr virus (EBV)-immortalised b cell lymphoblastoid line
