= Microplasma =

A microplasma is a plasma of small dimensions, ranging from tens to thousands of micrometers. Microplasmas can be generated at a variety of temperatures and pressures, existing as either thermal or non-thermal plasmas. Non-thermal microplasmas that can maintain their state at standard temperatures and pressures are readily available and accessible to scientists as they can be easily sustained and manipulated under standard conditions. Therefore, they can be employed for commercial, industrial, and medical applications, giving rise to the evolving field of microplasmas.

== What is a microplasma? ==
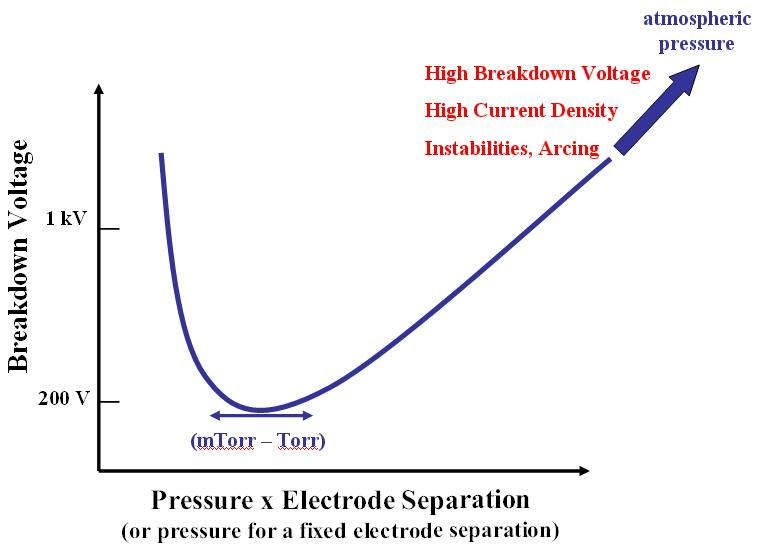
A simplified Paschen Breakdown Curve for most gases

There are 4 states of matter: solid, liquid, gas, and plasma. Plasmas make up more than 99% of the visible universe. In general, when energy is applied to a gas, internal electrons of gas molecules (atoms) are excited and move up to higher energy levels. If the energy applied is high enough, outermost electron(s) can even be stripped off the molecules (atoms), forming ions. Electrons, molecules (atoms), excited species and ions form a soup of species which involves many interactions between species and demonstrate collective behavior under the influence of external electric and magnetic fields. Light always accompanies plasmas: as the excited species relax and move to lower energy levels, energy is released in the form of light. Microplasma is a subdivision of plasma in which the dimensions of the plasma can range between tens, hundreds, or even thousands of micrometers in size. The majority of microplasmas that are employed in commercial applications are cold plasmas. In a cold plasma, electrons have much higher energy than the accompanying ions and neutrals. Microplasmas are typically generated at elevated pressure to atmospheric pressure or higher.

Successful ignition of microplasmas is governed by Paschen's Law, which describes the breakdown voltage (the voltage at which the plasma begins to arc) as a function of the product of electrode distance and pressure,

$$V_b=\frac{{B(pd)}}{{\ln(pd)+\ln(A/\ln(1+\frac{1}{\gamma}))}}$$

where pd is the product of pressure and distance, and $A$ and $B$ are the gas constants for calculating Townsend's first ionization coefficient and $\gamma$ is the secondary emission coefficient of the material. As the pressure increases, the distance between the electrodes must decrease to achieve the same breakdown voltage. This law is proven to be valid at inter-electrode distances as small as tens of micrometers and pressures higher than atmospheric. However, its validity at even smaller scales (approaching debye length) is still currently under investigation.

== Generating microplasmas ==
While microplasma devices have been studied experimentally for more than a decade, understanding has been spurred in the past few years as the result of modelling and computational investigations of microplasmas.

=== Confinement to small spaces ===
When the pressure of the gas medium in which the microplasma is generated increases, the distance between the electrodes must decrease to maintain the same breakdown voltage. In such microhollow cathode discharges, the product of pressure and distance ranges from fractions of Torr cm to about 10 Torr cm. At values below 5 Torr cm, the discharges are called "pre-discharges" and are low intensity glow discharges. Above 10 Torr cm the discharge can become uncontrollable and extend from the anode to random locations within the cavity. Further research by David Staack provided a graph of ideal electrode distances, voltages, and carrier gases tested for microplasma generation.

=== Dielectric materials ===
Dielectrics are poor electrical conductors, but support electrostatic fields and electric polarization. Dielectric barrier discharge microplasmas are typically created between metal plates, which are covered by a thin layer of dielectric or highly resistive material. The dielectric layer plays an important role in suppressing the current: the cathode/anode layer is charged by incoming positive ions/electrons during a positive cycle of AC is applied which reduces the electric field and hinders charge transport towards the electrode. DBD also has a large surface-to-volume ratio, which promotes diffusion losses and maintains a low gas temperature. When a negative cycle of AC is applied, the electrons are repelled off of the anode, and are ready to collide with other particles. Frequencies of 1000 Hz or more are required to move the electrons fast enough to create a microplasma, but excessive frequencies can damage the electrode (~50 kHz). Although dielectric barrier discharge comes in various shapes and dimensions, each individual discharge is in micrometer scale.

=== Pulsed power ===
AC and high frequency power are often used to excite dielectrics, in place of DC. Take AC as an example, there are positive and negative cycles in each period. When the positive cycle occurs, electrons accumulate on the dielectric surface. On the other hand, the negative cycle would repel the accumulated electrons, causing collisions in the gas and creating plasma. During the switch from the negative to positive cycles, the above-mentioned frequency range of 1000 Hz-50,000 Hz is needed in order for a microplasma to be generated. Because of the small mass of the electrons, they are able to absorb the sudden switch in energy and become excited; the larger particles (atoms, molecules, and ions), however aren't able to follow the fast switching, therefore keeping the gas temperature low.

=== Radio frequency and microwave signals ===
Based on transistor amplifiers low power RF (radio frequency) and microwave sources are used to generate a microplasma. Most of the solutions work at 2.45 GHz. Meanwhile, is a technology developed which provide the ignition (high voltage generation) on the one hand and the high efficient operation (matching of the plasma and the wave guide impedance) on the other hand with the same electronic and impedance transformer network.

=== Laser induced ===
With the use of lasers, solid substrates can be converted directly into microplasmas. Solid targets are struck by high energy lasers, usually gas lasers, which are pulsed at time periods from picoseconds to femtoseconds (mode-locking). Successful experiments have used Ti:Sm, KrF, and YAG lasers, which can be applied to a variety of substrates such as lithium, germanium, plastics, and glass.

== History ==
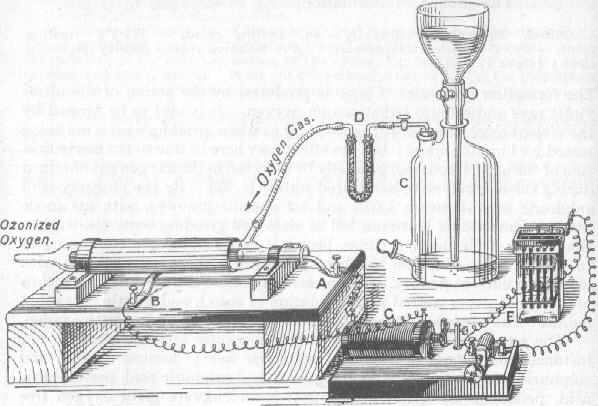
A - terminal connected to the inner surface, B - terminal connected to outer surface, C - gasholder, D - calcium chloride drying tube, E - battery, G - induction coil

In 1857, Werner von Siemens, a German scientist, originated ozone generation using a dielectric barrier discharge apparatus for biological decontamination. His observations were explained without the knowledge of "microplasmas", but were later recognized as the first use of microplasmas to date. The early electrical engineers, such as Edison and Tesla, were actually trying to prevent the generation of such "micro-discharges", and used dielectrics to insulate the first electrical infrastructures. Subsequent studies have observed the Paschen breakdown curve as being the prime cause of microplasma generation in an article published in 1916.

Subsequent articles during the course of the 20th century have described the various conditions and specifications that lead to the generation of microplasmas. After Siemens' interactions with microplasma, Ulrich Kogelschatz was the first to identify these "micro-discharges" and define their fundamental properties. Kogelschatz also realized that microplasmas could be used for excimer formation. His experiments spurred the rapid development of the microplasma field.

In February 2003, Kunihide Tachibana, a professor of Kyoto University held the first international workshop on microplasmas (IWM) in Hyogo, Japan. The workshop, titled "The New World of Microplasmas", opened a new era of microplasma research. Tachibana is recognized as one of the founding fathers as he coined the term "microplasma". The Second IWM was organized in October 2004 by Professors K.H. Becker, J.G. Eden, and K.H. Schoenbach at Stevens Institute of Technology in Hoboken, New Jersey. The third international workshop was coordinated by the Institute of Low Temperature Plasma Physics alongside the Institute of Physics of Ernst-Moitz-Arndt-University in Greifswald, Germany, May 2006 (K.D. Weltmann). Topics discussed were inspiring scientific and arising technological opportunities of microplasmas. The fourth IWM was held in Taiwan in October 2007 (C.C. Chao and J.E. Chang), the fifth in San Diego, California in March 2009 (J.G. Eden and S.-J. Park), and the sixth in Paris, France in April 2011 (V. Puech). The next (seventh) workshop was held in China in approximately May 2013 (Y.K. Pu).

== Applications ==
The rapid growth of applications of microplasmas renders it impossible to name all of them within a short space, but some selected applications are listed here.

=== Plasma displays ===
Artificially generated microplasmas are found on the flat panel screen of a plasma display. The technology utilizes small cells and contains electrically charged ionized gases. Across this plasma display panel, there are a millions of tiny cells called pixels that are confined to form a visual image. In the plasma display panels, X and Y grid of electrodes, separated by a MgO dielectric layer and surrounded by a mixture of inert gases - such as argon, neon or xenon, the individual picture elements are addressed. They work on the principle that passing a high voltage through a low-pressure gas generates light. Essentially, a PDP can be viewed as a matrix of tiny fluorescent tubes which are controlled in a sophisticated fashion. Each pixel comprises a small capacitor with three electrodes, one for each primary color (some newer displays include an electrode for yellow). An electrical discharge across the electrodes causes the rare gases sealed in the cell to be converted to plasma form as it ionizes. Being electrically neutral, it contains equal quantities of electrons and ions and is, by definition, a good conductor. Once energized, the plasma cells release ultraviolet (UV) light which then strikes and excites red, green and blue phosphors along the face of each pixel, causing them to glow.

=== Illumination (Light Source) ===
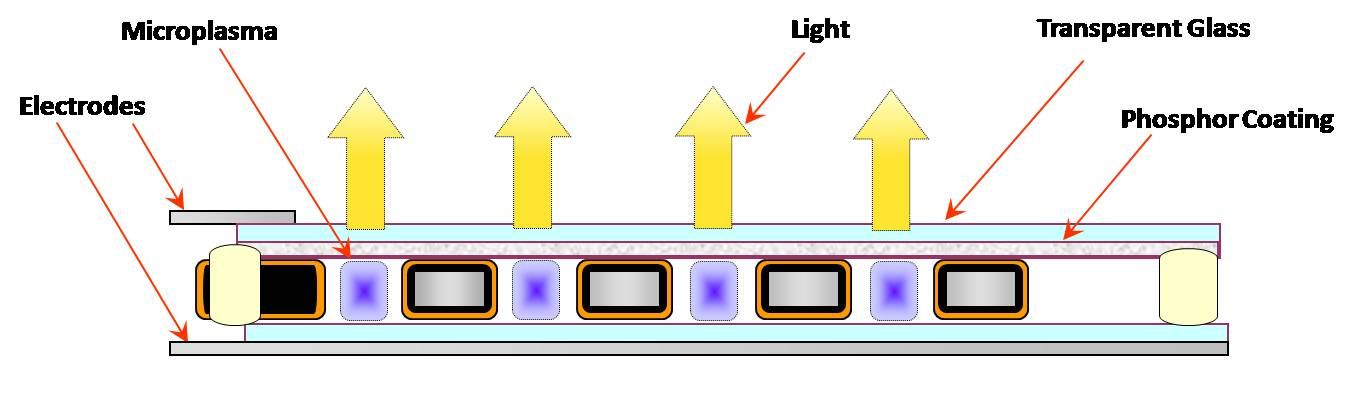
Schematic for device being developed by Eden and Park

The team of Gary Eden and Sung-Jin Park are pioneering the use of microplasmas for general illumination (as well as UV source). Their apparatus uses many microplasma generators in a large array, which emit light through a clear, transparent window. Unlike fluorescent lamps, which require the electrodes to be far apart in a cylindrical cavity and vacuum conditions, microplasma light sources can be put into many different shapes and configurations, and generate heat. This is opposed to the more commonly used fluorescent lamps which require a noble gas atmosphere (usually argon), where excimer formation and resulting radiative decomposition strikes a phosphor coating to create light. Excimer light sources are also being produced and researched. The stable, non-equilibrium condition of microplasmas favors three-body collisions which can lead to excimer formation. The excimer, an unstable molecule produced by collisions of excited atoms, is very short lived due to its rapid dissociation. Upon their decomposition, excimers release different kinds of radiation when electrons fall to lower energy levels. One application, which has been pursued by the Hyundai Display Advanced Technology R&D Research Center and the University of Illinois, is to use excimer light sources in flat panel displays. The technology moved further to the technology of a compact, flat source of UV and vacuum UV wavelengths for various applications.

=== Destruction of volatile organic compounds (VOC's) ===
Microplasma are used to destroy volatile organic compounds. For example, capillary plasma electrode (CPE) discharge was used to effectively destroy volatile organic compounds such as benzene, toluene, ethylbenzene, xylene, ethylene, heptane, octane, and ammonia in the surrounding air for use in advanced life support systems designed for enclosed environments. Destruction efficiencies were determined as a function of plasma energy density, initial contaminant concentration, residence time in plasma volume, reactor volume, and the number of contaminants in the gas flow stream. Complete destruction of VOC's can be achieved in the annular reactor for specific energies of 3 J cm−3 and above. Furthermore, specific energies approaching 10 J cm−3 are required to achieve a comparable destruction efficiency in the cross-flow reactor. This indicates that optimization of the reactor geometry is a critical aspect of achieving maximum destruction efficiencies. Koutsospyros et al. (2004, 2005) and Yin et al. (2003) reported results regarding studies of VOC destruction using CPE plasma reactors. All compounds studied reached maximum VOC destruction efficiencies between 95% and 100%. The VOC destruction efficiency increased initially with the specific energy, but remained at values of the specific energy that are compound-dependent. A similar observation was made for the dependence of the VOC destruction efficiency on the residence time. The destruction efficiency increased with rising initial contaminant concentration. For chemically similar compounds, the maximum destruction efficiency was found to be inversely related to the ionization energy of the compound and directly related to the degree of chemical substitution. This may suggest that chemical substitution sites offer the highest plasma-induced chemical activity.

=== Environmental sensors ===
The small size and modest power required for microplasma devices employ a variety of environmental sensing applications and detect trace concentrations of hazardous species. Microplasmas are sensitive enough to act as detectors, which can distinguish between excessive quantities of complex molecules. C.M. Herring and his colleagues at Caviton Inc. have simulated this system by coupling a microplasma device with a commercial gas chromatography column (GC). The microplasma device is situated at the exit of the GC column, which records the relative fluorescence intensity of specific atomic and molecular dissociation fragments. This apparatus possesses the ability to detect minute concentrations of toxic and environmentally hazardous molecules. It can also detect a wide range of wavelengths and the temporal signature of chromatograms, which identifies the species of interest. For the detection of less complex species, the temporal sorting done by the GC column is not necessary since the direct observation of fluorescence produced in the microplasma is sufficient.

=== Ozone generation for water purification ===
Microplasmas are being used for the formation of ozone from atmospheric oxygen. Ozone (O_{3}) has been shown to be a good disinfectant and water treatment that can cause breakdown of organic and inorganic materials. Ozone is not potable and reverts to diatomic oxygen, with a half-life of about 3 days in air room temperature (about 20 ^{0}C). In water, however, ozone has a half-life of only 20 minutes at the same temperature of 20 (^{0}C) . Degremont Technologies (Switzerland) produces microplasma arrays for commercial and industrial production of ozone for water treatment. By passing molecular oxygen through a series of dielectric barriers, using what Degremont calls the Intelligent Gap System (IGS), an increasing concentration of ozone is produced by altering the gap size and coatings used on the electrodes farther down the system. The ozone is then directly bubbled into the water to be made potable (suitable for drinking). Unlike chlorine, which is still used in many water purification systems to treat water, ozone does not remain in the water for extended periods. Because ozone decomposes with a half-life of 20 minutes in water at room temperature, there are no lasting effects that may cause harm.

== Current research ==
=== Fuel cells ===
Microplasmas serve as energetic sources of ions and radicals, which are desirable for activating chemical reactions. Microplasmas are used as flow reactors that allow molecular gases to flow through the microplasma inducing chemical modifications by molecular decomposition. The high energy electrons of microplasmas accommodate chemical modification and reformation of liquid hydrocarbon fuels to produce fuel for fuel cells. Becker and his co-workers used a single flow-through dc-excited microplasma reactor to generate hydrogen from an atmospheric pressure mixture of ammonia and argon for use in small, portable fuel cells. Lindner and Besser experimented with reforming model hydrocarbons such as methane, methanol, and butane into hydrogen for fuel cell feed. Their novel microplasma reactor was a microhollow cathode discharge with a microfluidic channel. Mass and energy balances on these experiments revealed conversions up to nearly 50%, but the conversion of electrical power input to chemical reaction enthalpy was only on the order of 1%. Although through modeling the reforming reaction it was found that the amount of input electrical power to chemical conversion could increase by improving the device as well as the system parameters.

=== Nanomaterial synthesis and deposition ===
The use of microplasmas is being looked into for the synthesis of complex macromolecules, as well as the addition of functional groups to the surfaces of other substrates. An article by Klages et al. describes the addition of amino groups to the surfaces of polymers after treatment with a pulsed DC discharge apparatus using nitrogen containing gases. It was found that ammonia gas microplasmas add on an average of 2.4 amino groups per square nanometer of a nitrocellulose membrane, and increase the strength at which the layers of the substrate can bind. The treatment can also provide a reactive surface for biomedicine, as amino groups are extremely electron-rich and energetic. Mohan Sankaran has done work on the synthesis of nanoparticles using a pulsed DC discharge. His research team has found that by applying a microplasma jet to an electrolytic solution which has either a gold or silver anode is submerged produces the relevant cations. These cations can then capture electrons supplied by the microplasma jet and results in the formation of nanoparticles. The research shows that more nanoparticles of gold and silver are shown in the solution than there are of the resulting salts that form from the acid conducting solution.

=== Cosmetics ===
Microplasma uses in research are being considered. The plasma skin regeneration (PSR) device consists of an ultra–high-radiofrequency generator that excites a tuned resonator and imparts energy to a flow of inert nitrogen gas within the handpiece. The plasma generated has an optical emission spectrum with peaks in the visible range (mainly indigo and violet) and near-infrared range. Nitrogen is used as the gaseous source because it is able to purge oxygen from the surface of the skin, minimizing the risk of unpredictable hot spots, charring, and scar formation. As the plasma hits the skin, energy is rapidly transferred to the skin surface, causing instantaneous heating in a controlled uniform manner, without an explosive effect on tissue or epidermal removal. In pretreatment samples, the zone of collagen shows a dense accumulation of elastin, but in posttreatment samples, this zone contains less dense elastin with significant, interlocking new collagen. Repeated low-energy PSR treatment is an effective modality for improving dyspigmentation, smoothness, and skin laxity associated with photoaging. Histologic analysis of posttreatment samples confirms the production of new collagen and remodeling of dermal architecture. Changes consist of erythema and superficial epidermal peeling without complete removal, generally complete by 4 to 5 days.Bogle, Melissa; et al. (2007). "Evaluation of plasma skin regeneration technology in low energy full-facial rejuvenation". Arch Dermatol. 143 (2): 168–174. doi:10.1001/archderm.143.2.168. PMID 17309997.

=== Microsputtering Thin Film Deposition ===
Active research into microplasma sputtering for conductive interconnect thin film deposition poses a potential additive manufacturing alternative to costly semiconductor industry production standards. Novel microputterers, operating with a continuously fed cathodic wire, employ print head reactors consisting of the wire terminus, two positively biased electrodes, and two opposing negatively charged focus electrodes to generate a microplasma environment within a sub-millimeter target-to-substrate separation space. As in traditional sputtering, the incited plasma bombards the exposed target surface, ejecting individual atoms which are then incident on the substrate surface, forming a conductive thin film. Contrasted with traditional applications, microplasma sputtering offers numerous advantages, including limited to no post-processing requirements, as controlled positioning of the substrate can produce precise patterning without the need for subsequent photolithographic masking and etching, and versatility of substrate form, in that microsputterers are not constrained to planar deposition. Additionally, atmospheric conditions permitted by this method eliminate the substantial cost barrier presented by the necessity for the expensive, complex vacuum systems in which contemporary sputtering operations are performed. To date this technique has failed to achieve the resolution of industry standard microelectronics, with pinnacle pathway width results of approx. 9μm, but noted potential for improvements to process gas flow and possible post-processing enhancements stand to assist in closing the gap. Given the method's relatively low cost and its broad versatility, attaining production quality on par with modern industry standards could potentially stand to spur a revolution in mass-customizable electronics.

== Plasma medicine ==
=== Dental treatments ===
Scientists found that microplasmas are capable of inactivating bacteria that causes tooth decay and periodontal diseases. By directing low temperature microplasma beams at the calcified tissue structure beneath the tooth enamel coating called dentin, it severely reduces the amount of dental bacteria and in turn reduces infection. This aspect of microplasma could allow dentists to use microplasma technology to destroy bacteria in tooth cavities instead of using mechanical means. Developers claim that microplasma devices will enable dentists to effectively treat oral-borne diseases with little pain to their patients. Recent studies show that microplasmas can be a very effective method of controlling oral biofilms. Biofilms (also known as slime) are highly organized, three-dimensional bacterial communities. Dental plaque is a common example of oral biofilms. It is the main cause of both tooth decay and periodontal diseases such as Gingivitis and Periodontitis. At the University of Southern California, Parish Sedghizadeh, Director of the USC Center for Biofilms and Chunqi Jiang, assistant research professor in the Ming Hsieh Department of Electrical Engineering-Electrophysics, work with researchers from Viterbi School of Engineering searching for new ways to fight off these bacterial infections. Sedghizadeh explained that the biofilms' slimy matrix acts as extra protection against traditional antibiotics. However, the centers' study confirms that biofilms cultivated in the root canal of extracted human teeth can be easily destroyed by the application of microplasma. The plasma emission microscopy obtained during each experiment suggests that the atomic oxygen produced by the microplasma is responsible for the inactivation of bacteria. Sedghizadeh then suggested that the oxygen free radicals could disrupt the biofilms cellular membrane and cause them to break down. According to their ongoing research at USC, Sedghizadeh and Jiang have found that microplasma is not harmful to surrounding healthy tissues and they are confident that microplasma technology will soon become a groundbreaking tool in the medical industry.J.K. Lee along with other scientists in this field have found that microplasma can also be used for teeth bleaching. This reactive species can effectively bleach teeth along with saline or whitening gels that consist of hydrogen peroxide. Lee and his colleagues experimented with this method, examining how microplasma along with hydrogen peroxide effects blood stained human teeth. These scientists took forty extracted single-root, blood stained human teeth and randomly divided them into two groups of twenty. Group one received 30% hydrogen peroxide activated by microplasma for thirty minutes in a pulp chamber, while group two received 30% hydrogen peroxide alone for thirty minutes in the pulp chamber and the temperature was maintained at thirty seven degrees Celsius for both groups. After the tests had been performed, they found that microplasma treatment with 30% hydrogen peroxide had a significant effect on the whiteness of the teeth in group one. Lee and his associates concluded that the application of microplasma along with hydrogen peroxide is an efficient method in the bleaching of stained teeth due to its ability to remove proteins on the surface of teeth and the increased production of hydroxide.

=== Wound care ===
Microplasma that is sustained near room temperature can destroy bacteria, viruses, and fungi deposited on the surfaces of surgical instruments and medical devices. Researchers discovered that bacteria cannot survive in the harsh environment created by microplasmas. They consist of chemically reactive species such as hydroxyl (OH) and atomic oxygen (O) that can kill harmful bacteria through oxidation. Oxidation of the lipids and proteins that compose a cell's membrane can lead to the breakdown of the membrane and deactivate the bacteria. Microplasma can contact skin without harming it, making it ideal for disinfecting wounds. "Medical plasmas are said to be in the 'Goldilocks' range—hot enough to produce and be an effective treatment, but cold enough to leave tissues unharmed" (Larousi, Kong 1). Researchers have found that microplasmas can be applied directly to living tissues to deactivate pathogens. Scientists have also discovered that microplasmas stop bleeding without damaging healthy tissue, disinfect wounds, accelerate wound healing, and selectively kill some types of cancer cells. At moderate doses, microplasmas can destroy pathogens. At low doses, they can accelerate the replication of cells—an important step in the wound healing process. The ability of microplasma to kill bacteria cells and accelerate the replication of healthy tissue cells is known as the "plasma kill/plasma heal" process, this led scientists to further experiment with the use of microplasmas for wound care. Preliminary tests have also demonstrated successful treatments of some types of chronic wounds.

=== Cancer treatments ===
Since microplasmas deactivate bacteria they may have the ability to destroy cancer cells. Jean Michel Pouvesle has been working at the University of Orléans in France, in the Group for Research and Studies on Mediators of Inflammation (GREMI), experimenting with the effects of microplasma on cancer cells. Pouvesle along with other scientists has created a dielectric barrier discharge and plasma gun for cancer treatment, in which microplasma will be applied to both in vitro and in vivo experiments. This application will reveal the role of ROS (Reactive Oxygen Species), DNA damage, cell cycle modification, and apoptosis induction. Studies show that microplasma treatments are able to induce programmed death (apoptosis) among cancer cells—stopping the rapid reproduction of cancerous cells, with little damage to living human tissues. GREMI performs many experiments with microplasmas in cancerology, their first experiment applies microplasma to mice tumors growing beneath the skin's surface. During this experiment, scientists found no changes or burns on the surface of the skin. After a five-day microplasma treatment, the results displayed a significant decrease in the growth of U87 glioma cancer (brain tumor), compared to the control group where microplasma was not applied. GREMI performed further in vitro studies regarding U87 gliomal cancer (brain tumors) and HCT116 (colon tumor) cell lines where microplasma was applied. This microplasma treatment was proven to be an efficient method in destroying cancer cells after being applied over periods of a few tens of seconds. Further studies are being conducted on the effects of microplasma treatment in oncology; this application of microplasma will impact the medical field significantly.
