= U937 (cell line) =

U-937 cells are a pro-monocytic model cell line used in biomedical research. They were isolated from the histiocytic lymphoma of a 37-year-old male patient in 1974. Due to the relative uniformity of expanded cultures and lower maintenance requirements these cells have been since used as an important tool for studying phagocyte differentiation and different kinds of cell-to-cell interactions. U-937 cells mature and differentiate in response to a number of soluble stimuli, adopting the morphology and characteristics of monocytes, macrophages or dendritic cells.

U-937 cells are of myeloid lineage and thus secrete a large number of cytokines and chemokines either constitutively (e.g., IL-1 and GM-CSF) or in response to soluble stimuli. TNFα and recombinant GM-CSF for example independently promote IL-10 production in U937 cells. This cell line is therefore widely used for cytokine level read-outs as a result of exposure to various chemical compounds. Namely, production of IL-1β, IL-6, IL-8, IL-10, TNF-α, iNOS, COX-2 and NF-κB is commonly measured.

U-937 cells bear the t(10;11)(p13;q14) translocation causing a fusion of MLLT10 and Ap-3-like clathrin assembly protein PICALM. The HLA alleles present in U-937 cells are HLA-A*03:01, A*31:01, B*18:01, B*51:01, Cw*01:02 and Cw*07:02.

== Maintenance & differentiation ==
U-937 line can be cultured in vitro for up to 3 months or stored frozen in -80 °C for several years following an appropriate protocol. RPMI 1640 or, alternatively, DMEM media can be used, both supplemented with 10% FBS and antibiotics (usually penicillin or streptomycin). In some cases, another supplement that can be utilized is zwitterionic buffer – HEPES.

=== Differentiation induction ===
Induction of differentiation of U-937 into monocytes or macrophages can be achieved by various agents such as PMA (phorbol 12-myristate 13-acetate), retinoic acids, vitamin D3 (1,25- dihydroxyvitamin D3) or TPA (12-O-tetradecanoylphorbol13-acetate). Further differentiation into dendritic cells can be induced by exposing them to self-peptide from apolipoprotein E (Ep1.B). This treatment leads to changes in surface marker expression and thus induces acquirement of DC-like morphology.

Beside the cell types mentioned above, U-937 cells can be differentiated into osteoclasts – cell subtype crucial for bone resorption and remodeling. This phenotype can be achieved by combining stimulation with PMA and vitamin D3 with addition of magnesium, which can further perpetuate the differentiation process.

== Special features & use in research ==
Due to limited possibilities for obtaining primary macrophages, U-937 cell line, beside the THP-1 cells, is a crucial tool for studying these phagocytes in vitro. It should be taken into account, however, that both of said cell lines offer distinct results following the culture. U-937-derived macrophages preferentially respond to M2-inducing stimuli, subsequently leading them to acquire the phenotype of alternatively activated macrophages. Whereas, in the case of THP-1 cells, the polarization is reversed in favor of classical M1 macrophages. Both cell lines can be artificially polarized in either direction though. The only difference being that the M1 phenotype establishment in U-937-derived macrophages will not be as strong as in THP-1, and vice versa.

=== Leukemia ===
According to Si et al. (2022), the U-937 cell line specifically could be a promising model for acute myeloid leukemia, as it was shown to actively express the JAK3^{M511I} activated mutation observed in about 10% of AML patients. In this study, they also confirm that the U-937 cells do respond to a model JAK3 inhibitor, and their proliferation is thus impaired by it.

=== Phagocytosis ===
As stated before, U-937 is a valuable tool for broadening the knowledge of phagocytes. One of the traits that are especially worth studying is their ability of ROS (reactive oxygen species) generation as a part of non-specific immune response. Prasad et al. (2020) present the current possibilities of ROS imaging in these cells via electron paramagnetic resonance spectroscopy and confocal laser scanning microscopy.

=== Apoptosis ===
U-937V is a variant cell line derived from the original U-937 cells, the difference being their increased susceptibility to the effects of TNFα. The unique feature of these cells is the absence of cellular disintegration as an accompanying phenomenon of apoptosis. It was documented that the basic molecular processes (degradation of DNA, PS externalization, caspase activity or CytC release) following the induction of apoptosis are not drastically changed in these cells. This subtype could therefore serve as a good model for regulation of apoptotic body formation or blebbing.
