= RBL =

RBL may refer to:

- RBL Bank, an Indian bank
- RBL cells, cells used in the study of allergy
- RBL Posse, a hip hop group from San Francisco, California
- RB Leipzig, a German football club
- Real-time Blackhole List or DNSBL, a list of IP addresses most often used to publish addresses linked to spamming
- Reasonable benefit limits, a limit on Australian retirement benefits
- Research Bureau Limited, the former name of Research International
- Rifled breech loader, a type of artillery
- Rogers Broadcasting Limited, a Canadian broadcasting company owned and operated by Rogers Communications
- The Royal British Legion, a British charity
- Rubber band ligation, an outpatient treatment for internal hemorrhoids
- Miraya Bikol (ISO 639 code: rbl), a variety of the Albay Bikol language
- Red Bluff Municipal Airport (FAA LID: RBL), an airport in California, United States
- "Rbl", an abbreviation for the Belarusian ruble
