= Ham's tissue culture medium =

Growth medium for mammalian cells

Ham's tissue culture medium is a growth medium for mammalian cells.

== Contents ==
It contains in amounts dissolved in 1 liter of triple distilled water:

L-Arginine 211 mg
Biotin 0.024 mg
L-Histidine 21 mg
Calcium pantothenate 0.7 mg
L-Lysine 29.3 mg
Choline chloride 0.69 mg
L-Methionine 4.48 mg
i-inositol 0.54 mg
L-Phenylalanine 4.96 mg
Niacinamide 0.6 mg
L-Tryptophan 0.6 mg
Pyridoxine hydrochloride 0.2 mg
L-Tyrosine 1.81 mg
Riboflavin 0.37 mg
L-Alanine 8.91 mg
Thymidine 0.7 mg
Glycine 7.51 mg
Cyanocobalamin 1.3 mg
L-Serine 10.5 mg
Sodium pyruvate 110 mg
L-Threonine 3.57 mg
Lipoic acid 0.2 mg
L-Aspartic acid 13.3 mg
CaCl_{2} 44 mg
L-Glutamic acid 14.7 mg
MgSO_{4}·7H_{2}O 153 mg
L-Asparagine 15 mg
Glucose 1.1 g
L-Glutamine 146.2 mg
NaCl 7.4 g
L-Isoleucine 2.6 mg
KCl 285 mg
L-Leucine 13.1 mg
Na_{2}HPO_{4} 290 mg
L-Proline 11.5 mg
KH_{2}PO_{4} 83 mg
L-Valine 3.5 mg
Phenol red 1.2 mg
L-Cysteine 31.5 mg
FeSO_{4} 0.83 mg
Thiamine hydrochloride 1 mg
CuSO_{4}·5H_{2}O 0.0025 mg
Hypoxanthine 4 mg
ZnSO_{4}·7H_{2}O 0.028 mg
Folic acid 1.3 mg
NaHCO_{3} 1.2 g

== See also ==
- Biotechnology
- Brewing
- Cell biology
- DMEM Dulbecco's Modified Eagle's Medium
- Eagle's minimal essential medium (a minimum ingredient cell culture medium)
- Fermentation (food)
- GMEM (Glasgow's Minimal Essential Medium)
- Murashige and Skoog medium (Plant cell culture medium)
- RPMI (Roswell Park Memorial Institute medium), for lymph cells
