= T98G =

T98G is a glioblastoma cell line used in brain cancer research and drug development.

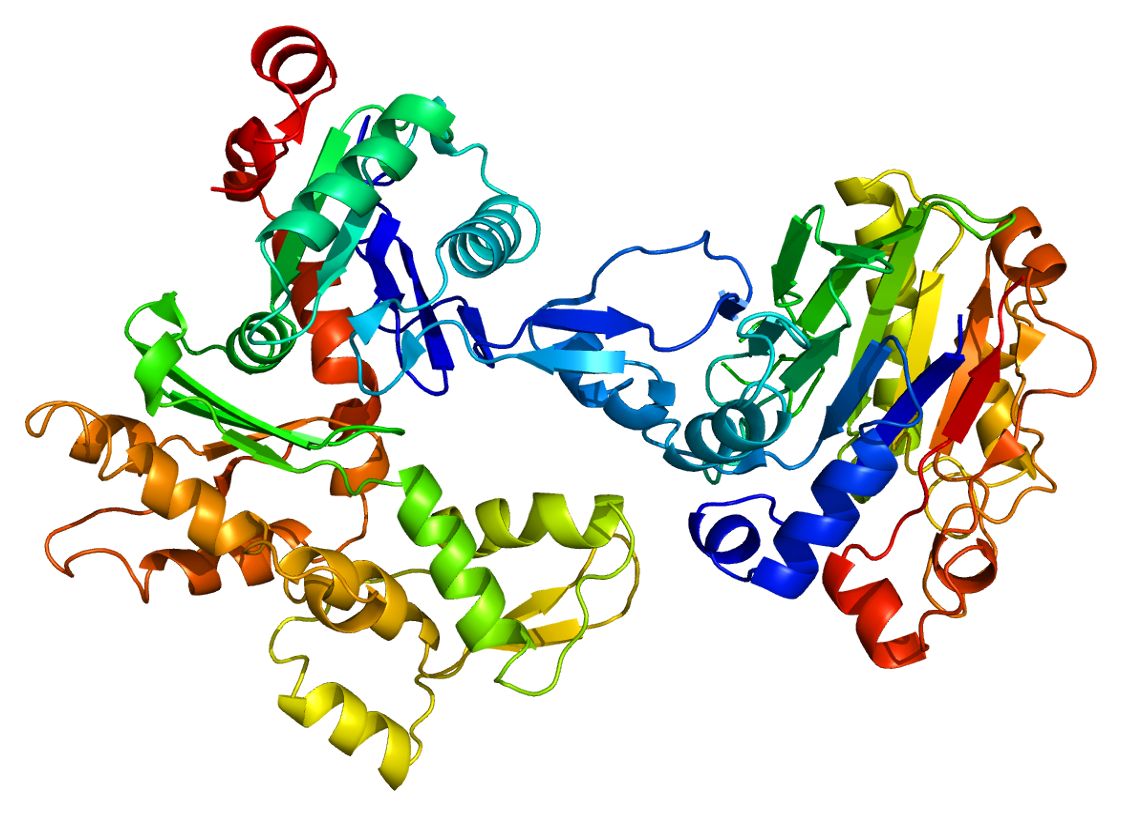
The ACTA2 protein, which is involved in muscle contraction, is present in large amounts in the T98G cell line.

The T98G cell line was derived from a 61-year-old human male and has a hyper pentaploid chromosome count with a modal number ranging from 128 to 132. The cells are not tumorigenic in mice but do proliferate with proper anchorage in cell culture. T98G cells are known for having high expression of the ACTA2 gene, which is involved in cell motility and structure. T98G cells are polyploidy variants of the parent T98 cell line, and can stay in the G1 phase of the cell cycle under stationary conditions.

T98G cells have been investigated along with A172 cells for drug cytotoxicity, and were found to be resistant to cisplatin, with larger cytotoxic effects induced by viral-mediated production of the p53 protein.
