= Zebrafish AB9 cell line =

Zebrafish AB9 cells are a primary fibroblast cell line developed from fin tissue of the AB strain. These cells are commonly used for studies focusing on the biochemical and molecular properties of zebrafish. Cells are grown in Dulbecco's modified Eagle's medium (DMEM) supplemented with 15% fetal bovine serum (FBS) in a humid, 5% CO_{2}-enriched atmosphere at 28 °C. Under these conditions, cells passaged 1 in 4 doubled every 72 hours when fed with fresh culture medium at 3-day intervals.

== Primary Zebrafish Embryonic Fibroblast Cell Culture ==
Zebrafish is an important vertebrate and emerged as an important model for genetics, developmental biology, chemical biology, and regeneration. In order to establish cell culture about 200-300 zebrafish Ab strain embryos at 5-10 somite stage were dechorionated by 300 ul/mL protease treatment and washed with PBS. Followed by dilution in 1:400 in PBS for 2 minutes and broken up into small parts with 0.05% trypsin/EDTA and plated on 25 cm^2 Collagen I Biocoated flask. Cells were cultured in a medium composed of DMEM. The medium is further enriched with 25 ng/ml human epidermal growth factor. After the second passage, cells were cultured again in a medium similar to the first with the exclusion EGF and bbFGF. Primary zebrafish embryonic fibroblasts, ZEF1 and ZEF2 were maintained at 29C and 5% CO_{2} for two and three months before transfection.

== Immunofluorescence on AB9 cells ==
AB9 cells were incubated at 5% CO_{2} at 28 C and grown in tissue culture dishes with minimal essential media (DMEM) supplemented with 15% heat inactivated FBS and antibiotics-antimycotics. The cells were then placed poly-L-lysine coverglass and allowing it to grow to 80-90% confluency. Afterwards, they were washed with cold PBS and suspended in a solution of 4% paraformaldehyde in PBS for 30 minutes at room temperature. After 30 minutes have passed we once again wash the cells with 1X PBS, three times for five minutes. We will puncture the cell membrane with 0.2% triton in PBS for 10 minutes. Followed with multiple washes of 1X PBS and blocked in room temperature for one hour in 1% BSA in PBS. We let it sit overnight, and the next day the cells were washed with 1X PBS three time for five minutes each. After washing the cells we incubate with secondary antibody for one hour at room temperature, protecting our sample from any light source. It was followed with an additional three washes for five minutes of 1X PBS and a quick wash of dH2O. The AB9 cells were mounted with vectashield and were examined under Nikon Eclipse TE2000-U at 60X.

== Functional Assays in AB9 Cells ==
Knocking down a protein mean that an organism's genes are reduced. To knockdown AB9 the first thing that is test is if electroporation is a reliable method for uptake of MO or antisense morpholinos. We begin by electrophoralting fluorescein labeled cx43 MO into AB9 cells, using fluorescein labeled standard control MO as the control. We observe that the efficiency of 50-70%. Next we test the MO uptake of AB9 led by protein knockdown. Lysates were prepared from Standard curve and cx43 Mo treated cells at 25 hpe. Next, we try to determine if we can block protein function by treating AB9 with pharmacological agents. The inhibitor in this case will be Hsp47 and we treat the cell with 100 um of the inhibitor, using DMSO control.
