= VCaP =

Cell line

VCaP cells are a cell line of human prostate cancer commonly used in the field of oncology. The tissue was harvested at autopsy from a metastatic lesion to a lumbar vertebrae of a 59 year old Caucasian male with hormone refractory prostate cancer in 1997, which was then xenografted into SCID mice and later harvested and plated on tissue culture dishes, where it can be propagated as an immortalized prostate cancer cell line.

== Characteristics ==
VCaP are an adherent, epithelial cell line with high Androgen receptor and Prostate specific antigen expression. VCaP are the only prostate cancer cell model that express the Androgen receptor splice variant, AR-V7, and the TMPRSS2-ERG gene fusion.

The cells have an approximate doubling time of 53 hours, and require more specific culture conditions than other prostate cancer cell lines. VCaP cells are XMRV virus positive and produce the mouse xenotropic retrovirus Bxv-1, likely acquired during passaging in infected mice.
