= J558L cells =

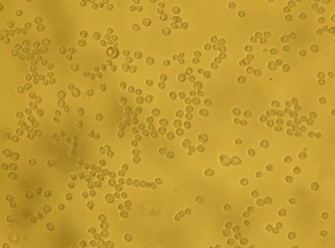
J558L (Mouse B Myeloma) Cell Line

J558L cells are mouse B myeloma cells derived from a BALB/c strain isolated by M. Bruggeman and M.S. Neuberger in the University of Cambridge. It is a stable B cell line used to express antibodies. They are a suspension cell line and are best cultured in Eagle's minimal essential medium with 10% Fetal bovine serum, 0.01 units/ml of penicillin and 0.1 mg/ml streptomycin incubated in 37 °C + 5% CO_{2} + 90% relative humidity with a cell density of 5 × 10^{5} cell per 15 ml.

== Uses ==
This cell line is usually used to express antibodies since they can result in antibody titers up to 1 mg under optimum conditions.
