= Antibiotic-Antimycotic =

Antibiotic solution for cell culture media

Antibiotic-Antimycotic is a solution that is commonly added to cell culture media to prevent contamination by various bacteria and fungi. It generally contains 10,000 units per milliliter penicillin, 10,000 micrograms per milliliter streptomycin, and 25 micrograms per milliliter amphotericin B.

Penicillin is a Beta-lactam antibiotic that is effective in inhibiting Gram-positive bacteria. Streptomycin is an aminoglycoside antibiotic which is effective against most Gram-negative bacteria. Amphotericin B is effective against multi-cellular fungi and yeasts.

== Biotechnology uses ==
=== Mammalian cell culture ===
In human cell culture Antibiotic-Antimycotic solution was used to wash follicular aspirate and granulosa lutein cells to avoid microbial contamination during human oocyte retrieval for assisted reproductive techniques. In animal cell culture, Antibiotic-Antimycotic solution was used to wash goat embryos prior to incubation with oviduct and uterine cells, for enhanced development of embryos into blastocysts. In large-scale bioreactors, contamination risk is high due to the connection of tubing from inlets and outlets. Antibiotic-Antimycotic solution was incorporated into media for culturing suspension-adapted human embryonic kidney (HEK) 293 cell lines in bioreactors.

=== Tissue engineering ===
The ability to isolate cell types is an important component of tissue engineering. In order to prevent contamination during seeding of human fibroblasts followed by endothelial cells on polymeric scaffolds, Antibiotic-Antimycotic solution was used during the following steps: Washing newborn foreskins, culturing fibroblasts, washing ascending aortal tissues to obtain endothelial cells, and seeding onto the scaffold.

Chemical and physical data
Molecular Formula	C_{16}H_{18}N_{2}O_{4}S; C_{21}H_{39}N_{7}O_{12}; C_{47}H_{73}NO_{17}
Molecular Weight:	334.39; 581.57; 924.08

== See also ==
- Cell culture
