= VG-1 (cell line) =

VG-1 is a B cell line which was derived from primary effusion lymphoma (PEL) (Lu et al. 2009). It was first established in 2000 by David T. Scadden's group at Massachusetts General Hospital. It is infected with Kaposi's sarcoma-associated herpesvirus (KSHV), but negative with Epstein–Barr virus (EBV) (Brander et al. 2000).
