= High Five cells =

Insect cell line

High Five (BTI-Tn-5B1-4) is an insect cell line that originated from the eggs of the cabbage looper, Trichoplusia ni. It was developed by the Boyce Thompson Institute for Plant Research.

High Five cells have become one of the most commonly used cell lines for recombinant protein expression using baculovirus or transfection, and have been demonstrated to express more recombinant protein than other lepidopteran cell lines, such as Sf9 cells. The High Five cells have been used to produce the VLP-based HPV vaccine Cervarix.

They can be grown in the absence of serum, and can be cultured in a loose attached state or in suspension High Five cells produce abundant microRNAs (miRNAs), small interfering RNAs (siRNAs), and PIWI-interacting RNAs (piRNAs), making it suitable to study all three types of small silencing RNAs.

The High Five cell line, like other cell lines, has been found to host a non-pathogenic adventitious alphanodavirus. Researchers at the Boyce Thompson Institute were able to isolate virus-free sub-clones, named Tnao38 and Tnms42.

In 2026, researchers from the Boyce Thompson Institute published a research article showing that the High Five cells not only contain a alphanodavirus, but also a macula-like virus. The article showed that both Tnao38 and Tnms42 are directly derived from BTI-TN-5B1-4, and that they are free of the two adventitious viruses present in High Five. Based on this observation and the fact that these two cell lines had accidentally emerged from a primary cell culture from a different insect species, the team developed a co-culturing method where Sf9 cells and BTI-TN-5B1-4 cells were grown in a same well, but separated by a porous membrane. Within a few passages of this co-culture, the BTI-TN-5B1-4 cells were cured from both adventitious viruses.

The team then used these new virus-free BTI-TN-5B1-4 cells to complete two steps of single cell cloning and selected the best performing cell lines for the production of secreted alkaline phosphatase (SEAP) and beta-galactosidase. The two best candidates were then shipped to a research team at the Instituto de Biologia Experimental e Tecnológica (iBET) to confirm the protein production capability with a candidate malaria antigen and an ADDomer nanoparticle.

The two cell lines, named 2D10_B10 and 3D7_C3 in the article, have been named TnX1^{TM} and TnX2^{TM} respectively, and are collectively referred to as the TnX^{TM} cell lines. They can be obtained from the Boyce Thompson Institute in replacement of High Five.
