= Glioma 261 =

Glioma 261 (GL261) is a murine glioma cell line that is widely used as a preclinical model for studying glioblastoma multiforme (GBM). GBM is an aggressive form of primary brain tumor in humans. The GL261 model was originally derived from a C57BL/6 mouse after it was exposed to methylcholanthrene, and it has been one of the most characterized and used experimental glioma models due to its molecular similarity to human glioblastoma.

== History and Development ==
The Glioma 261 cell line was first established in the 1970’s after the chemical induction of glioma into C57BL/6 mice. Its use became more widespread after detailed biological and molecular characterization led to revealing it possessing several features that resemble human glioblastoma. Characteristics include invasive growth, chromosomal abnormalities, and mutations in crucial oncogenic pathways.

In 2006, a study done by Szatmári et al. provided one of the most comprehensive early analyses of GL261 tumors by describing their morphology, growth behavior, genetic mutations, and immunogenicity both in vitro and in vivo. Their work established a benchmark for future studies using GL261 as a foundation for glioma research, specifically in gene therapy and immunotherapy.

== Biological, Molecular, and Genetic Characteristics ==
GL261 tumors exhibit many distinctive characteristics of malignant gliomas, such as angiogenesis, infiltrative invasion, and rapid proliferation in the surrounding brain tissue. These tumors are usually classified as high-grade gliomas and display heterogeneity in cell morphology and gene expression.

At the genomic level, GL261 cells show mutations and alterations in pathways commonly disrupted in human glioblastoma, like the p53, PTEN, and Rb tumor suppressor pathways. The cell line also demonstrates upregulation of the epidermal growth factor receptor (EGFR) and other growth-promoting signaling cascades that drive uncontrolled proliferation.

More recent work using single-nucleus RNA sequencing (snRNA-seq) has provided high-resolution transcriptomic data comparing GL261 with human glioblastoma subtypes. García-Vicente et al. (2025) found that GL261 closely models the mesenchymal subtype of GBM, which is one of the most common and aggressive human subtypes. This study confirmed that GL261 replicates several transcriptional and cellular features of human glioblastoma, but it does lack some subtype-specific markers found in proneural or classical GBMs.

== Immune Profile ==
Unlike many xenograft models that require immunodeficient mice, GL261 can be implanted in immunocompetent C57BL/6 mice, allowing researchers to study tumor-immune interactions in a physiologically relevant environment. GL261 tumors are moderately immunogenic, expressing major histocompatibility complex (MHC) class I and II molecules and stimulating detectable immune responses. However, the tumors also develop immune-suppressing mechanisms, including the recruitment of regulatory T cell (Tregs), tumor-associated macrophage (TAMs), and myeloid-derived suppressor cell (MDSCs) within the tumor microenvironment.

Functional profiling has shown that GL261 utilizes several immune-evasion pathways that mirror those found in human glioblastoma, including upregulation of immune checkpoint molecules such as PD-L1 and CTLA-4. Despite these similarities, certain transcriptomic differences remain. For instance, GL261 may exhibit a higher baseline expression of interferon-response genes than typical human GBMs, which reflects species-specific immune dynamics.

== Research Applications ==
=== Preclinical Immunotherapy Models ===
GL261 is essential in preclinical testing of glioma immunotherapies. The cell line’s compatibility with immunocompetent mice enables evaluation of treatments such as immune checkpoint inhibitors, cancer vaccines, chimeric antigen receptor (CAR) T-cell therapies, and oncolytic viral therapies.

Frederico et al. (2023) reviewed the use of GL261 in evaluating glioma-targeted immunotherapies, noting its balance between experimental feasibility and translational relevance. The model demonstrates variable immune infiltration and consistent expression of MHC molecules, making it a representative system for testing immune-based treatments.

Compared to other murine glioma models such as CT2A, which is less immunogenic, or SB28, which is more resistant to immunotherapy, GL261 occupies a position somewhere in the middle, which is suitable for proof-of-concept and mechanistic studies.

=== Gene and Viral Therapy Studies ===
Szatmári et al. (2006) demonstrated that GL261 cells are susceptible to infection by retroviral and adenoviral vectors, enabling delivery of therapeutic genes or reporter constructs. This property has been leveraged in multiple gene therapy studies exploring suicide gene delivery and cytokine expression. The model’s permissiveness for viral transduction also allows for use in studies involving CRISPR-Cas9 gene editing and fluorescent tagging to track tumor growth and invasion.

=== Tumor Tracking and Imaging ===
Recent innovations have modified GL261 to facilitate non-invasive imaging of tumor progression. Mishchenko et al. (2022) developed GL261-kat, a variant expressing a far-red fluorescent protein (TurboFP635). This adaptation allows for real-time imaging of tumor growth through fluorescence microscopy, MRI, or in vivo optical systems. The red-shifted signal penetrates deeper into brain tissue, improving visualization of intracranial tumor dynamics without the need for invasive sampling. These imaging-enabled variants are valuable for quantifying therapeutic efficacy and monitoring tumor recurrence in studies over long periods of time.

== GL261 in Comparison to Human Glioblastoma ==
Even though GL261 is a murine mouse model, it exhibits several molecular, cellular, and immunological characteristics similar to human glioblastoma. They both have heterogeneous cell populations (resembling tumor stem-like and differentiated cells), invasive growth patterns, and local brain infiltration, and they both also activate core oncogenic pathways (such as EGFR, PI3K/AKT, and Ras/MAPK) and express immune checkpoint molecules and recruit immunosuppressive cell types.

However, they do have some differences: GL261 tumors often have a more robust immune infiltration than human GBMs, which are typically “immune cold.” Immune cold is a term used in oncology to describe a tumor that is largely hidden from the immune system and has a low immune response. Additionally, GL261 lacks certain driver mutations common in human GBMs (like TERT promoter mutations) and displays murine-specific gene expression profiles.

Recent single-nucleus RNA sequencing comparisons have clarified that GL261 most closely mimics mesenchymal glioblastoma, which is a subtype associated with inflammation and immune activity. Other subtypes, such as proneural glioblastomas, are not as accurately represented by this model, leading some researchers to combine GL261 data with other murine systems for subtype-specific studies.

== Advantages and Limitations ==
The GL261 glioma model has many advantages that make it a valuable tool in experimental glioblastoma research. Its compatibility with an immunocompetent host (C57BL/6 background) allows for the study of tumor–immune system interactions in a physiologically relevant setting. Extensive molecular and histological characterization allows for reproducible and comparable studies across labs. The model’s moderate immunogenicity supports investigation into both immune activation and suppression mechanisms, while its adaptability for genetic modification, fluorescent labeling, and viral transduction provides flexibility for mechanistic and therapeutic studies. Moreover, GL261 tumors share similarities with the mesenchymal subtype of human glioblastoma, enhancing their clinical relevance.

Even though GL261 has numerous advantages, some limitations still remain. Differences in the immune microenvironment and tumor evolution between mice and humans restrict direct translational applicability. The model does not fully represent the genetic diversity seen in human glioblastoma, and the overexpression of certain immune-related genes may artificially amplify responses to immunotherapies. Additionally, the rapid tumor growth and smaller brain size of mice can limit the predictability of clinical outcomes.

As highlighted by Mikolajewicz et al. (2024), each murine glioma model presents distinct immune-evasion phenotypes, and no single system perfectly mirrors human disease. Therefore, GL261 is often used in combination with other models to triangulate therapeutic efficacy and biological validity.
