= Sf21 =

Cell line

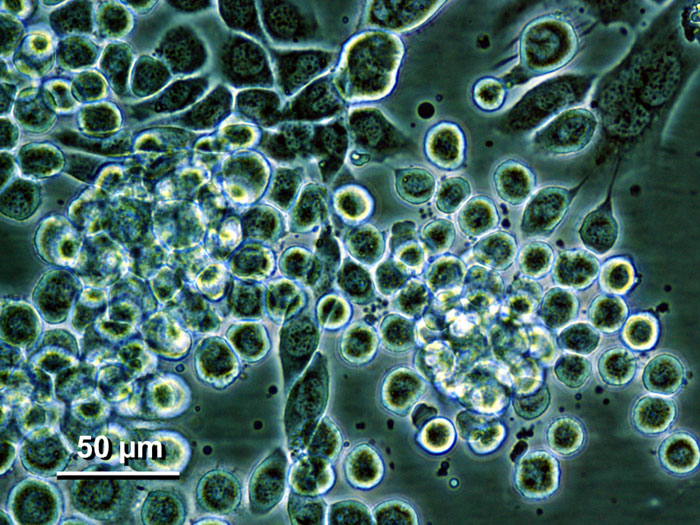

Sf21 (officially called IPLB-Sf21-AE) is a continuous cell line developed from ovaries of the Fall Army worm, Spodoptera frugiperda, a moth species that is an agricultural pest on corn and other grass species. It was originally developed in the United States at the Henry A. Wallace Beltsville Agricultural Research Center. Sf9 is a substrain (clone) of these cells that was isolated from Sf21 by researchers at Texas A&M University.

Both the clone and parent strains of the cells have been extensively used in research on viruses, especially baculoviruses in their use for producing recombinant proteins.
