= T-47D =

Human breast cancer cell line

Karyotype of the T47D breast cancer cell line

T-47D is a human breast cancer cell line commonly used in biomedical research involving the hormonal expression of cancer cells.

== Characteristics ==
The cells were derived from the pleural effusion of a ductal carcinoma found in the mammary gland of an elderly human patient. T-47D cells are distinct from other human breast cancer cells in that their progesterone receptors are not regulated by estradiol, a hormone that is abundant within the cells themselves.

== Usage ==
T-47D cells have been employed in studies of the effects of progesterone on breast cancer and the corresponding transcriptional regulation caused by introduced drugs. T-47D cells can be implanted into immunodeficient mice, forming xenografts that can undergo drug testing with corresponding receptor status and angiogenesis changes. The cells have been noted to be extremely resistant to estrogens and antiestrogens, possibly due to inhibition by 5-bromodeoxyuridine and sodium butyrate.
