= Schneider 2 cells =

Cell line from an insect

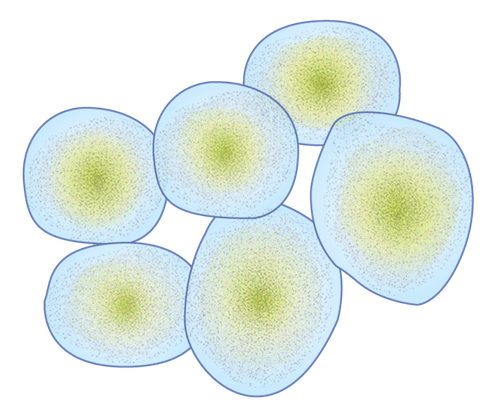
Schneider 2 cells

Schneider 2 cells, usually abbreviated as S2 cells, are one of the most commonly used Drosophila melanogaster cell lines. S2 cells were derived from a primary culture of late stage (20–24 hours old) Drosophila melanogaster embryos by Dr. Imogene Schneider, likely from a macrophage-like lineage.

S2 cells can be grown at room temperature both as a semi-adherent monolayer or in suspension, and they can be grown in the absence of serum.

Several media have been developed for culturing insect cell lines with many of them suitable for culturing S2 cells. The S2 cells have been shown to grow up to 5.1 × 10^{7} cells/ml in serum free medium and above 10^{7} cells/ml in basal media such as that used in Schneider's experiments. ExpreS2ion Biotechnologies have shown a cell concentration of up 7.0 × 10^{7} cell/ml.

S2 cells are often used for expression of heterologous proteins and can be used for large-scale production of proteins. Additionally, the cells can be easily transiently transfected with several plasmids at once to study protein interactions.
