= MC3T3 =

Cell line

MC3T3 is an osteoblast precursor cell line derived from Mus musculus (mouse) calvaria.

A number of derivatives of this strain have been isolated to select for varying degrees of osteogenic potential, and have been widely used as model systems in bone biology. A standard textbook calls its MC3T3-E1 sub-line "one of the most convenient and physiologically relevant systems for study of transcriptional control in calvarial osteoblasts." This is a spontaneously transformed ( immortalized ) cell line. As such, it is a very convenient research tool but caution should be used when extrapolating these results to normal cells, and even more, to normal human cells.

When cultured on tissue culture plastic or hydrogels without cell adhesion motifs MC3T3 cells adopt a polygonal shape without considerable polarization and focal adhesions. Beyond a critical density of cell adhesion motifs MC3T3 cells polarize and form stable focal adhesions. MC3T3 cells show higher proliferation and polarization on stiff substrates.

The MC3T3 cell line is also used for modeling skeletal tissue regeneration because its undifferentiated state is phenotypically similar to that of an osteochondroprogenitor cell. One published research article, using MC3T3-E1 cells as a model for studying cartilage regeneration, describes some of the specific limitations of the cell line for understanding behavior in human cells.
