= DAOY (biology) =

DAOY is a widely used human medulloblastoma cell line. It has epithelial morphology and was obtained from a 4-year-old Caucasian boy in 1985. It can be obtained from the American Type Culture Collection (ATCC) where it is known by the catalog number HTB-186. Its proteome and phenotype have been investigated in many publications.

DAOY is most commonly grown in Eagle's minimal essential medium with 10% FBS and antibiotics. It is incubated at 37 degrees Celsius in a 5% carbon dioxide atmosphere.
