= AHL-1 cells =

The AHL-1 (Armenian Hamster Lung-1) cell line is derived from the lung of a normal, adult, male Armenian hamster, Cricetulus migratorius, and used for pulmonary physiology research.
