= Rotary Cell Culture System =

Device to grow cell cultures in microgravity

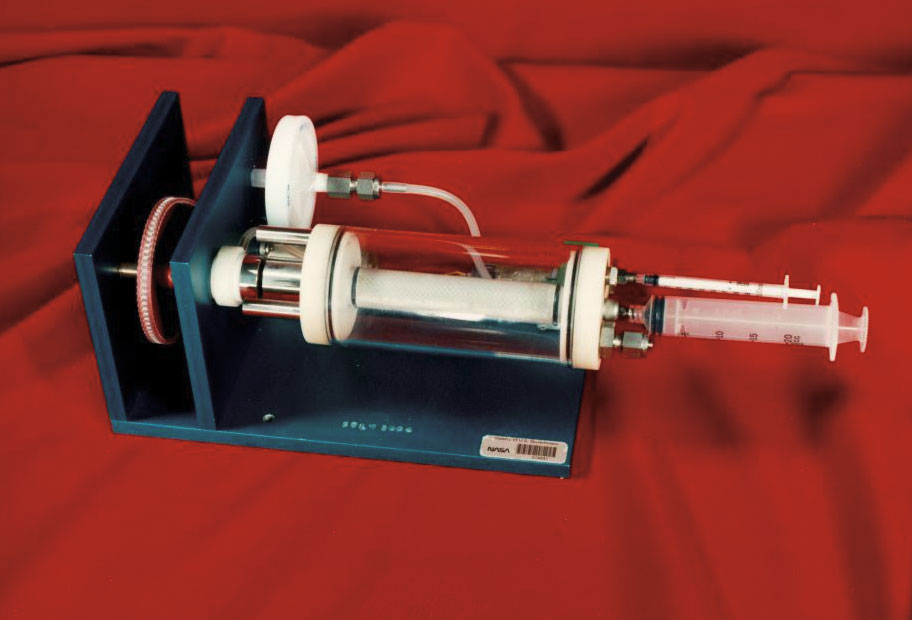
The NASA bioreactor provides a low turbulence environment, promoting the formation of large, three-dimensional cell clusters. Credit: NASA

The Rotary Cell Culture System (RCCS) is a device designed to grow three-dimensional cell clusters in microgravity. In the early 1990s, NASA researchers began developing hardware that would let them study the cell tissues of mammals—including humans—in microgravity. They also needed it to protect the fragile cultures from the turbulence of Space Shuttle launch and landing. The resulting device enables the growth of tissue, cancer tumors and virus cultures outside the body, both in space and on Earth.

The cell culture bioreactor—known commercially as the Rotary Cell Culture System (RCCS) -- boasts several advantages that exceed typical laboratory methods. Lab-grown cell cultures tend to be small, flat and two-dimensional, unlike normal cultures. But tissues grown in the RCCS are larger and three-dimensional, with structural and chemical characteristics similar to normal tissue. Additionally, the RCCS has no internal moving parts, therefore minimizing any forces that might damage the delicate cell cultures.

== Uses ==
Using RCCS technology, researchers could potentially test chemotherapy agents on a patient's own cancer cells outside the patient's body. There are similar possibilities for AIDS research: the RCCS can produce human HIV host cells that can be infected and studied.

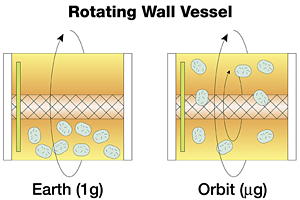
Cell constructs grown in a rotating bioreactor on Earth (left) eventually become too large to stay suspended in the nutrient media. In the microgravity of orbit, the cells stay suspended. Credit: NASA

RCCS can be used to study cancer, cystic fibrosis and infectious diseases such as the avian flu, Ebola virus and monkey pox. RCCS can provide tissues for the development of HIV vaccines and other drugs. Another application of RCCS is to growing replacement tissue for liver, skin and bone marrow.

A closed tubular cylinder forms the system's cell culture chamber, which is filled with a liquid medium in which cells grow on micrometre-size beads. The chamber rotates around a horizontal axis, allowing the cells to develop in an environment similar to the free-fall of microgravity. Oxygen, required by cells for growth, is fed into the liquid medium through a porous wall in the chamber.

The NASA researchers who led the development of the cell culture bioreactor were named co-recipients of the 1991 NASA Inventor of the Year Award because of their work on the project.
