= BCP-1 cells =

Cell line

BCP-1 cells are a clonal lymphoma cell line. They were derived from the peripheral blood mononuclear cells of an HIV seronegative patient with a body cavity based primary effusion lymphoma (PEL). BCP-1 cells are positive for KSHV, but negative for EBV. The cell line is used extensively for KSHV serologic assays and epidemiologic studies as well as other KSHV laboratory studies such as KSHV reactivation from latency with TPA or ectopic expression of KSHV ORF 50. BCP-1 has been deposited to ATCC by the creators for public use in research: https://web.archive.org/web/20070929090610/http://www.atcc.org/common/catalog/numSearch/numResults.cfm?atccNum=CRL-2294.

== References and notes ==
- Gao SJ, Kingsley L, Li M, Zheng W, Parravicini C, Ziegler J, Newton R, Rinaldo CR, Saah A, Phair J, Detels R, Chang Y, Moore PS (1996). "KSHV antibodies among Americans, Italians and Ugandans with and without Kaposi's sarcoma". Nat. Med. 2 (8): 925–8. doi:10.1038/nm0896-925. PMID 8705864. S2CID 10275045.
- Boshoff C, Gao SJ, Healy LE, Matthews S, Thomas AJ, Coignet L, Warnke RA, Strauchen JA, Matutes E, Kamel OW, Moore PS, Weiss RA, Chang Y (1998). "Establishing a KSHV+ cell line (BCP-1) from peripheral blood and characterizing its growth in Nod/SCID mice". Blood. 91 (5): 1671–9. doi:10.1182/blood.V91.5.1671. PMID 9473233.
