= U-87 MG =

In cell biology, U-87 MG is a human glioblastoma cell line that is commonly used in brain cancer research.

== History and Characteristics ==
Formally known as U-87 MG (abbreviation for Uppsala 87 Malignant Glioma), the U87 cell line has an epithelial morphology and was obtained from a 44-year-old female patient in 1966 at Uppsala University. The cell line was thought to be deposited at the Memorial Sloan Kettering Cancer Center in 1973, after which the ATCC obtained it in 1982. However, in 2016 the commonly used version of U87MG (from the ATCC) was found to be non-identical to its patient of origin. Analysis of DNA profile and mtDNA position suggest that the Uppsala U-87 MG line is authentic to the original tumor tissue while the ATCC U-87 MG line is not; The ATCC line is likely a bona fide human glioblastoma cell line of unknown origin. The entire sequence of the genome of U-87 MG has been published in PLoS Genetics. U-87 MG can be obtained from the American Type Culture Collection (ATCC) where it is known by the accession number HTB-14 and it is reported that the cell line comes from a male patient of unknown age.

== Growth conditions ==
U87 growth media is generally made with Eagle's minimum essential medium + 10% FBS + 100 U/mL penicillin + 100 μg/mL streptomycin. It is propagated at 37 °C in a 5% carbon dioxide atmosphere.
