= Saos-2 cells =

Saos-2 ("sarcoma osteogenic") is a cell line derived from the primary osteosarcoma of an 11-year-old Caucasian girl in 1973 by Fogh et al. The cell line is commonly used in bone cancer research as a model for testing novel therapies.

In 1987 Rodan et al. determined that Saos-2 cells "possess several osteoblastic features and could be useful as a permanent line of human osteoblast-like cells and as a source of bone-related molecules."

Besides their worldwide availability, some of the advantages for using Saos-2 cell line are that they have well-documented characterization data, the possibility to obtain large amounts of cells in short time, and the fact that Saos-2 cells can be fully differentiated in a manner that the osteoblastic cells naturally do. The latter point is described particularly as "the ability of Saos-2 cells to deposit a mineralization-competent extracellular matrix", which makes these cells a valuable model for studying events associated with the late osteoblastic-osteocyte differentiation stage in human cells.
