= Severe combined immunodeficient mice =

Mice used in the research of human disease like AIDS

Mice with severe combined immunodeficiency (SCIDs) are often used in the research of human disease. Human immune cells are used to develop human lymphoid organs within these immunodeficient mice, and many different types of SCID mouse models have been developed. These mice allow researchers to study the human immune system and human disease in a small animal model.

== Discovery ==
The mutation causing SCIDs in mice was discovered by Melvin and Gayle Bosma in 1983 in the CB/17 mouse line. SCIDs occurs in these mice due to a mutation in the gene for protein kinase, DNA activated, catalytic polypeptide (PRKDC), which plays a role in repairing double-stranded DNA breaks. This has implications for B and T cell receptor development, which is dependent upon such double-stranded breaks and subsequent repairs in order to rearrange V, D, J or V and J segments.

Mice with SCIDs have lymphocyte progenitors, but these cells are unable to survive to maturity. This results in a lack of B and T cells in the thymus and in the secondary lymphoid organs, such as the spleen and lymph nodes. Some SCID mice are able to produce monocytes, granulocytes, and red blood cells from the hematopoietic stem cells (HSC) present in their bone marrow. Due to their immunodeficiency, mice with SCIDs often die young if not kept under extremely sterile conditions.

The absence of functional B cells results in an organism that is unable to produce antibodies. This failure to create antibodies prevents most SCID mice from rejecting non-self tissues. Some SCID mice are shown to reject skin grafts, so it has been proposed that this disease arises from a leaky mutation, meaning that some mice with SCIDs do in fact have a somewhat functional adaptive immune system.

== Types ==
There are many types of SCID mice used by researchers at present. Some examples include SCID-hu Thy/Liv mice, which are given human fetal thymus and liver cells, hu-SRC-SCID mice, which are implanted with human hematopoietic stem cells (HSC), and hu-PBL-SCID mice, in which human peripheral blood mononuclear cells have been injected. Each line of mouse has different functional and nonfunctional cells, making each suited for different experiments.

In particular, it has been observed that SCID mice with an added mutation for interleukin-2 receptor common gamma chain (IL2Rγ) are better able to accept transplantation of human HSC and create human B and T cells. Studies such as those conducted by Ito et al. have found that non-obese diabetic (NOD) SCID IL2Rγ mice are even better suited as models for tissue transplants from non-self organisms due to their lower rate of rejection of human cells. NOD/SCID IL2Rγ mice have also been used to study human melanoma.

== Use in research ==
SCID mice can serve many functions in research, particularly in the study of human physiology and disease. The study of human physiology in human models is often made impossible due to ethical limitations, high financial expense, and low availability of model environments. Furthermore, results gleaned from the study of human cells ex vivo may not be indicative of their functions in vivo. Due to their immunodeficient state, SCID mice are able to accept human hematopoietic stem cells harvested from human bone marrow or thymus. This can lead to the development of human adaptive immune cells, such as B and T lymphocytes, within SCID mice, and for subsequent study of human cells in vivo.

SCID mice have allowed for increased research on a wide range of topics, including the development and pluripotency of human HSC, human-specific diseases and their interactions with the human immune system, vaccination, and cancer. SCID mice with human immune cells are able to respond to pathogens such as viruses and create antibodies against them, which has helped scientists better understand how the human immune system protects against pathogen infection. For example, they have been used to study Dengue virus and malaria, as well as to assess the efficacy of drugs that target these diseases.

The use of SCID mice has been questioned as a model for studying the human immune system. Some studies have suggested that after a period of time, human T cells in the immunocompromised mice become anergic, meaning that they no longer respond to stimuli. Thus, these mice may be able to host a human immune system, but one that may not be functioning properly.

== SCID mice and HIV ==
Immune compromised mice have become of particular interest for studying the Human Immunodeficiency Virus (HIV), how it interacts with the host in human lymphoid organs, as well as how treatments work in vivo. While HIV normally cannot infect mice, SCID mice have been used to study HIV. Prior to the use of humanized SCID mice, ape models were used to study HIV due to their genetic similarity to humans. However, due to the endangered status of chimps, the cost of maintaining them, and the slight differences between human and chimp interactions with HIV, humanized mice have been accepted as a more effective model organism for the study of this disease.

NOD/SCID mice can be transplanted with human fetal liver, bone, thymus, and lymphoid cells from blood transplants, leading to the formation of human immune cells, such as B and T cells, within the mice. These mice are then infected with the virus and researchers are able to study how HIV attacks the human lymphocytes and causes acquired immunodeficiency syndrome (AIDS) over time. Furthermore, humanized mouse models can also be used to test potential therapies for this disease, including gene-based therapies.
