= JY cell line =

The JY cell line is an Epstein–Barr virus (EBV)-immortalised B cell lymphoblastoid line. JY cells express HLA class-I A2 and class-II DR. JY is a suspension cell line, although the cells are known to grow in clumps. The growth medium is RPMI 1640, 10% fetal calf serum and 1% L-glutamine. JY cells are positive for murine leukemia virus.
