= THP-1 cell line =

Human monocytic cell line

THP-1 is a human monocytic cell line derived from an acute monocytic leukemia patient. It is used to test leukemia cell lines in immunocytochemical analysis of protein-protein interactions, and immunohistochemistry.

== Characteristics ==
Although THP-1 cells are of the same lineage, mutations can cause differences as the progeny proliferates. In general, THP-1 cells exhibit a large, round, single-cell morphology. The cells were derived from the peripheral blood of a 1-year-old human male with acute monocytic leukemia. Some of their characteristics are:

- Expression of Fc receptor and C3b receptors while lacking surface and cytoplasmic immunoglobulins.
- Production of IL-1.
- Positive detection of alpha-naphthyl butyrate esterase and lysozymes
- Phagocytic physiology (both for latex beads and sensitized erythrocytes).
- Restoration of the response of purified T lymphocytes to Con A.
- Increased CO_{2} production on phagocytosis and differentiation into macrophage-like cells
- Polarization into the M1 phenotype by incubation with IFN-γ and LPS, or to the M2 phenotype by incubation with interleukin 4 and interleukin 13
- Differentiation into immature dendritic cells, using recombinant human interleukin 4 (rhIL-4) and recombinant human granulocyte macrophage colony-stimulating factor (rhGM-CSF), and mature dendritic cells using rhIL-4, rhGM-CSF, recombinant human tumour necrotic factor α (rhTNF-α) and Ionomycin.
- The HLA type for THP-1 is HLA-A*02:01; A*24:02; B*15:11; B*35:01; C*03:03; DRB1*01:01; DRB1*15:01; DQB1*05:01; DQB1*06:02; DPB1*02:01; DPB1*04:02 (in the German Collection of Microorganisms and Cell Cultures (DSMZ) cell bank). This HLA type can change depending on the reference biorepository, due to loss of heterozygosity in multiple chromosomal regions, as THP-1 from the American Type Culture Collection (ATCC) do not express the HLA-A*24:02 and B*35:01 alleles.

=== Growth Information ===
THP-1 can provide continuous culture when grown in suspension; RPMI 1640 + 10% FBS + 2mM L-Glutamine. The average doubling time is 19 to 50 hours. 1 mM sodium pyruvate, penicillin (100 units/ml) and streptomycin (100 μg/ml) are also commonly added to inhibit bacterial contamination. Cultures should be maintained at cell densities in the range 2-9 × 10^{5} cells/ml at 37 °C, 5% CO_{2}. Cells are non-adherent.

=== Hazards ===
THP-1 cells are of human origin, and no evidence has been found for the presence of infectious viruses or toxic products. The ATCC Biosafety recommendation is level 1.

=== Research applications ===
THP-1 cells are used as a models to study the monocyte-macrophage differentiation process, antigen presentation and as a model to examine some macrophage-related physiological processes, for example the macrophage cholesterol efflux.
