= RBL cells =

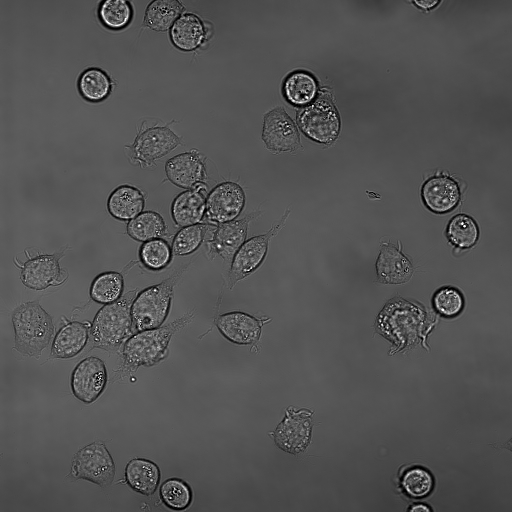
RBL (Rat Basophilic Leukaemia) Cell Line

RBL (Rat Basophilic Leukemia cells) are cancerous basophil cells that are well suited for the study of allergies.

== Uses ==
RBL cells are used in allergy studies due to the strong response of the cells to IgE and its FcεRI receptor. They are used in place of mast cells due to a higher stability in tissue culture. RBL cells can also be humanized, aiding in the specificity of allergy studies to human patients.

== Infections ==
Mycoplasma bacterial infections greatly affects the cell mediator release for biological assays, therefore regular Mycoplasma tests need to be performed since the bacteria colonizes the cell surface and cannot be visualized through a light microscope.
