= Sf9 (cells) =

Insect cell line

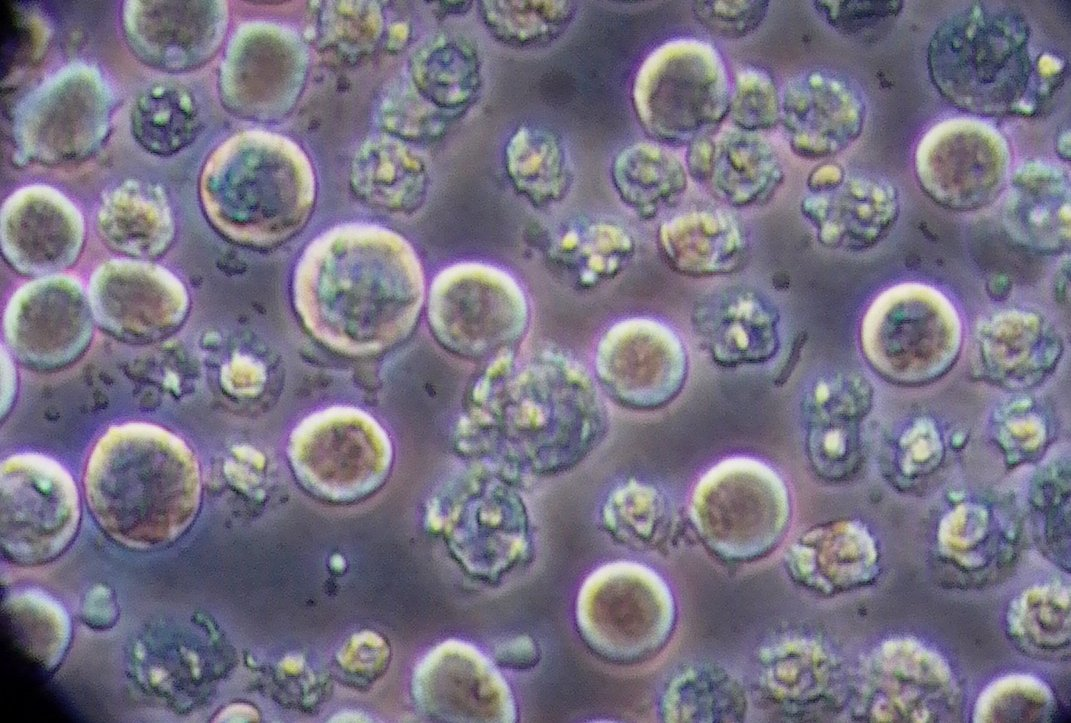

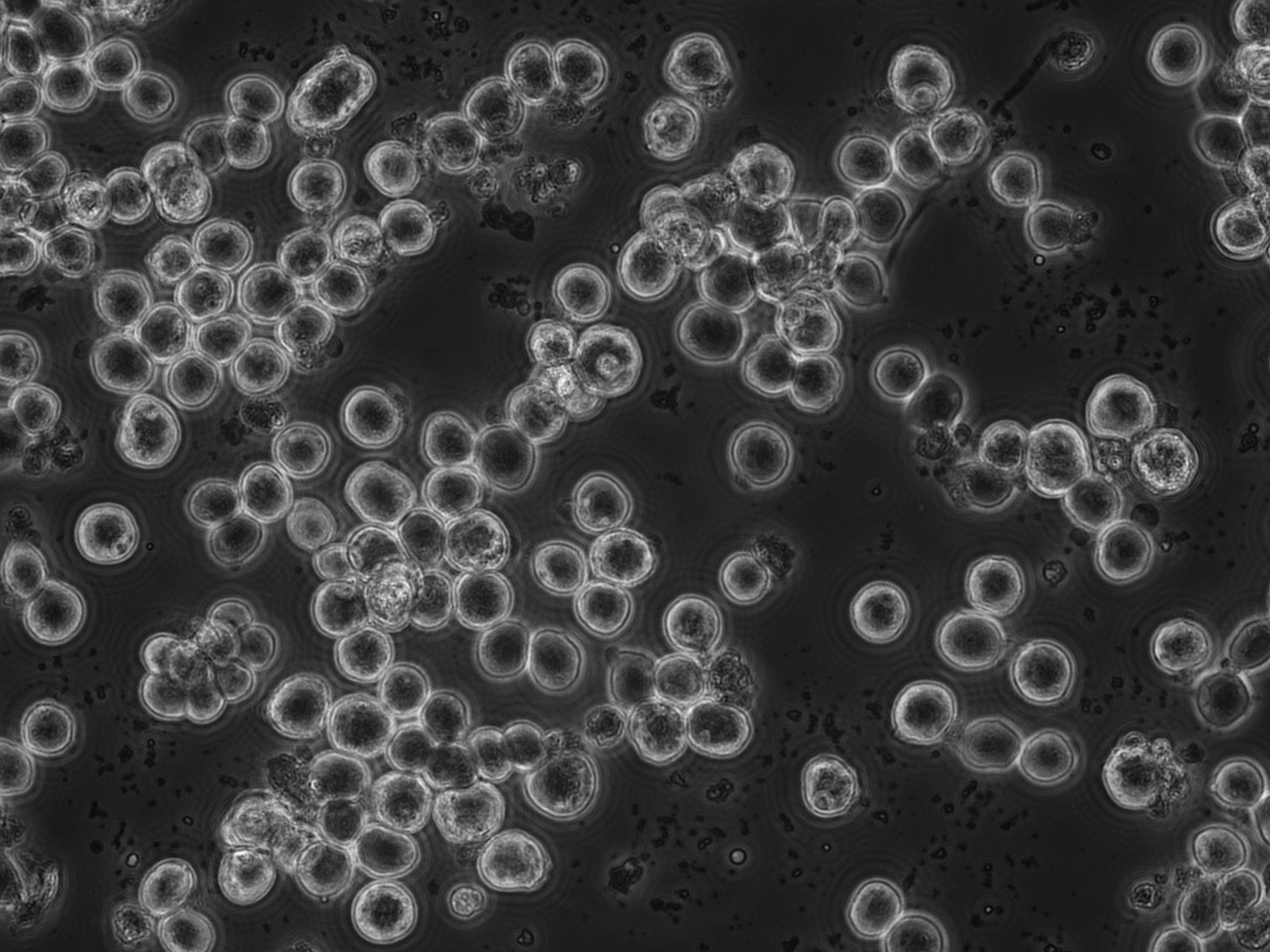
Phase contrast image of SF9 cells

Sf9 cells, a clonal isolate of Spodoptera frugiperda Sf21 cells (IPLB-Sf21-AE), are commonly used in insect cell culture for recombinant protein production using baculovirus expression system. They were originally established from ovarian tissue. They can be grown in the absence of serum, and can be cultured attached or in suspension.

Sf9 cell lines are widely utilized in the manufacture of recombinant protein antigens, including certain COVID-19 vaccines (like NVX-CoV2373 or ZF2001). Because subunit vaccines contain only specific viral components, they are generally considered safe for use across diverse demographic groups, including individuals with reduced immune function, as well as children and older adults. An additional practical advantage of this vaccine type is its stability, allowing for easier storage and distribution.

== Sf9 Rhabdovirus ==
It has previously been shown that some Sf9 cell lines harbor a negative sense Rhabdovirus called Spodoptera frugiperda rhabdovirus (SfRV). However, not all tested Sf9 cells appear to be infected with this virus. SfRV appears to be insect-specific and does not appear to infect mammalian cell lines.
