= Eagle's minimal essential medium =

Type of synthetic cell culture medium

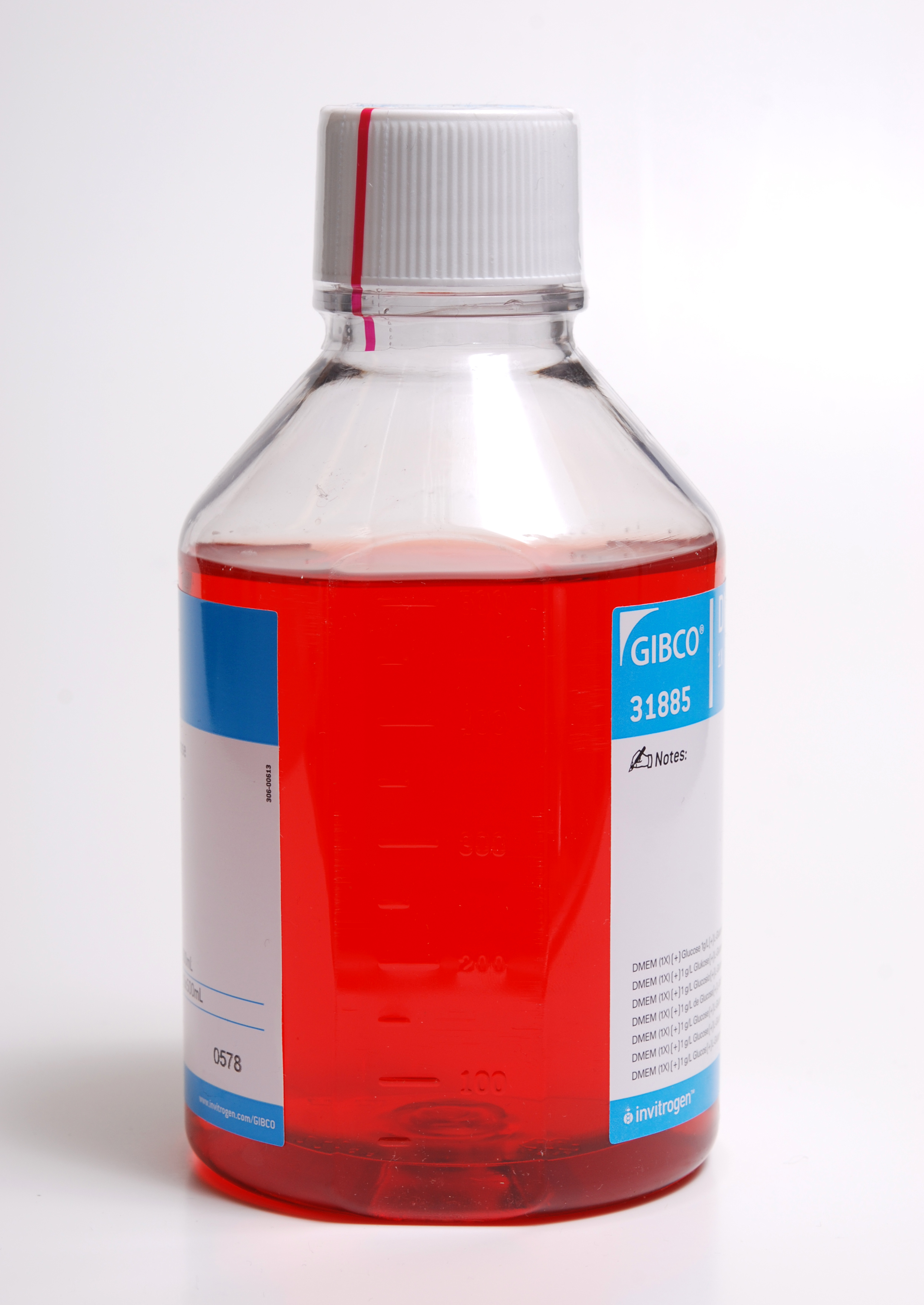
Bottle of DMEM cell culture medium

Minimal essential medium (MEM) is a synthetic cell culture medium developed by Harry Eagle first published in 1959 in Science that can be used to maintain cells in tissue culture. It is based on six salts and glucose described in Earle's salts in 1943: calcium chloride, potassium chloride, magnesium sulfate, sodium chloride, sodium phosphate and sodium bicarbonate. The medium is further supplemented with thirteen essential amino acids, and eight vitamins: thiamine (vitamin B_{1}), riboflavin (vitamin B_{2}), nicotinamide (vitamin B_{3}), pantothenic acid (vitamin B_{5}), pyrodoxine (vitamin B_{6}), folic acid (vitamin B_{9}), choline, and myo-inositol (originally known as vitamin B_{8}). Many variations of this medium have been developed, mostly adding additional vitamins, amino acids, and/or other nutrients.

Eagle developed his earlier "Basal Medium Eagle" (BME) in 1955–1957 on mouse L cells and human HeLa cells, with 13 essential amino acids and 9 vitamins added. BME contains biotin (vitamin B_{7}), which Eagle later found to be superfluous. His 1959 "minimal essential medium" doubles the amount of many amino acids to "conform more closely to the protein composition of cultured human cells. This permits the cultures to be kept for somewhat longer periods without refeeding".

DMEM (Dulbecco's modified Eagle's medium) was originally suggested as Eagle's medium with a 'fourfold concentration of amino acids and vitamins' by Renato Dulbecco and G. Freeman published in 1959. The commercial versions of this medium have additional modifications, see an example in the table below.

α-MEM (minimal essential medium Eagle – alpha modification) is a medium based on MEM published in 1971 by Clifford P. Stanners and colleagues. It contains more non-essential amino acids, sodium pyruvate, and vitamins (ascorbic acid (vitamin C), biotin, and cyanocobalamin) compared with MEM. It can also come with lipoic acid and nucleosides.

Glasgow's MEM (Glasgow minimal essential medium) is yet another modification, prepared by Ian MacPherson and Michael Stoker.

== Composition ==
One liter of each medium contains (in milligrams):

Medium	BME	MEM	α-MEMa	DMEM
Glycine			50	30
L-alanine			25	
L-arginine hydrochloride	21	126	126	84
L-asparagine-H_{2}O			50	
L-aspartic acid			30	
L-cysteine hydrochloride-H_{2}O			100	
L-cystine 2HCl	16	31	31	63
L-glutamic acid			75	
L-glutamine	292	292	292	584
L-histidine	8		31	42
L-histidine hydrochloride-H_{2}O		42	42	
L-isoleucine	26	52	52	105
L-leucine	26	52	52	105
L-lysine hydrochloride	36.47	73	73	146
L-methionine	7.5	15	15	30
L-phenylalanine	16.5	32	32	66
L-proline			40	
L-serine			25	42
L-threonine	24	48	48	95
L-tryptophan	4	10	10	16
L-tyrosine disodium salt dihydrate	26	52	52	104
L-valine	23.5	46	46	94
Ascorbic acid			50	
Biotin	1		0.1	
Choline chloride	1	1	1	4
D-calcium pantothenate	1	1	1	4
Folic acid	1	1	1	4
Niacinamide	1	1	1	4
Pyridoxal hydrochloride	1	1	1	4
Riboflavin	0.1	0.1	0.1	0.4
Thiamine hydrochloride	1	1	1	4
Vitamin B12			1.36	
i-Inositol	2	2	2	7.2
Calcium chloride (CaCl_{2}, anhyd.)	200	200	200	200
Ferric nitrate (Fe(NO_{3})_{3}·9H_{2}O)				0.1
Magnesium sulfate (MgSO_{4}, anhyd.)	97.67	97.67	97.67	97.67
Potassium chloride (KCl)	400	400	400	400
Sodium bicarbonate (NaHCO_{3})	2200	2200	2200	3700
Sodium chloride (NaCl)	6800	6800	6800	6400
Sodium phosphate monobasic (NaH_{2}PO_{4}-H_{2}O)	140	140	140	125
D-Glucose (dextrose)	1000	1000	1000	1000
Lipoic acid			0.2	
Phenol red	10	10	10	15
Sodium pyruvate			110	110

== See also ==
- RPMI 1640 (Roswell Park Memorial Institute medium), for lymph cells
