= Royal Academy of Medicine of Belgium =

Belgian medical research institute

- Académie royale de médecine de Belgique
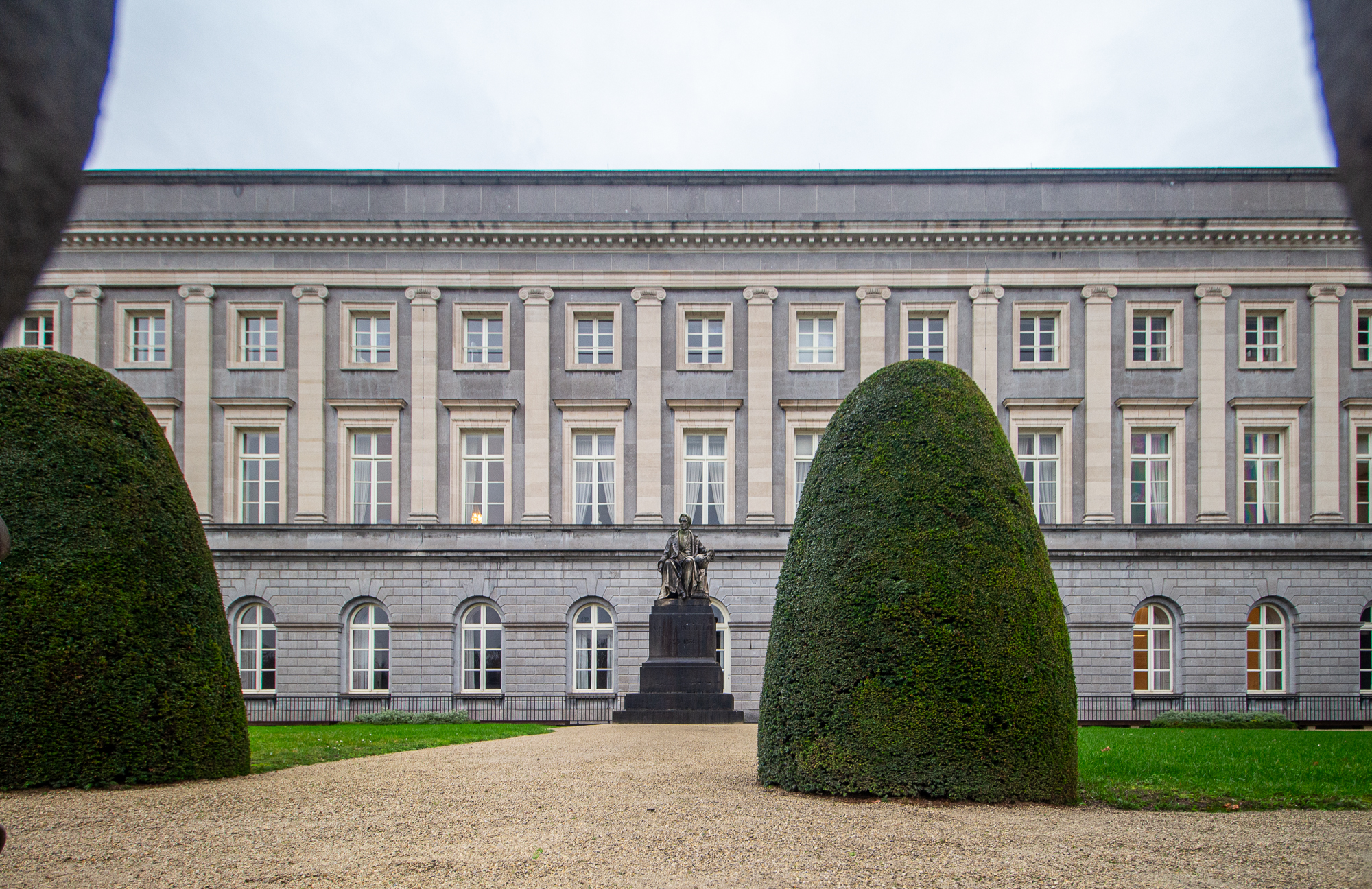
- Formation: 19 September 1841
- Founder: King Leopold I
- Founded at: Brussels, Belgium
- Type: Academy
- Headquarters: Palace of Academies, Brussels
- Location: Belgium
- Website: armb.be

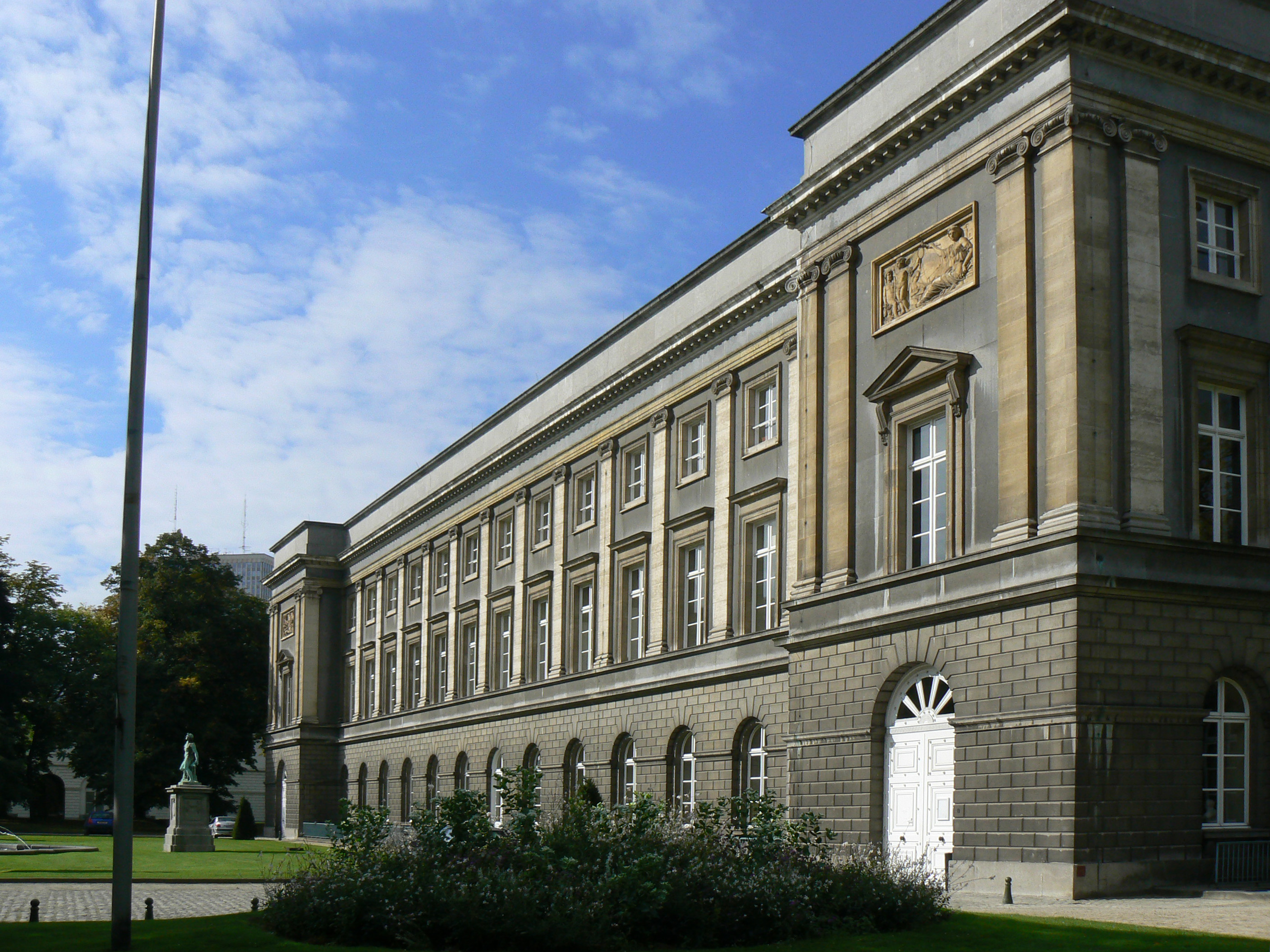
Academy Palace, headquarters of the Royal Academy of Medicine of Belgium

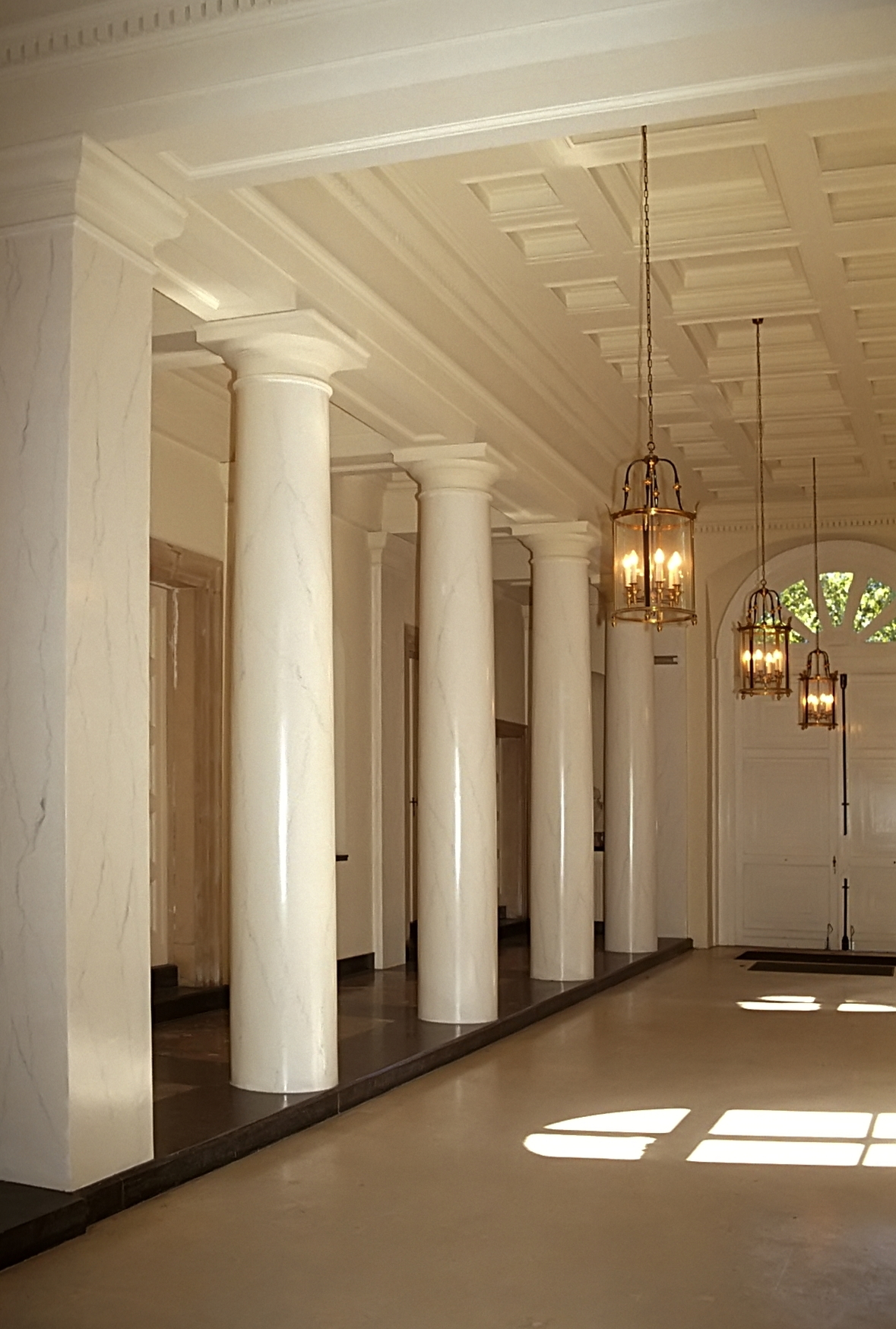
Hall of the Palace of the Academies, Brussels

Royal Academy of Medicine of Belgium (French: Académie royale de médecine de Belgique, pronounced [akademi ʁwajal də medəsin də bɛlʒik]), founded on 19 September 1841 by royal decree of King Leopold I, is an academy that brings together Belgian scientists. It is headquartered in Brussels at the Palace of Academies.

== History ==
The Royal Academy of Medicine is a public institution founded on 19 September 1841 by royal decree of King Leopold I, upon the proposal of Jean-Baptiste Nothomb. Among the founders were Victor-Joseph François, a professor at the Faculty of Medicine of the Catholic University of Louvain, and Louis Seutin (1793–1862), a professor at the Faculty of Medicine of the Free University of Brussels. The academy depended on the Ministry of the Interior, which was under the charge of J.B Nothomb. The academy became an advisory body to the Ministry of Health upon its creation in 1936. In the years 1989–1990, it was administratively attached to the services of the Government of the French Community of Belgium. The statutes of the institution depend on a decree of the Government of the French Community dated 19 December 2013, and it was placed under the protection of the King.

== Activities ==
The usual activities of the Royal Academy of Medicine include:

- the organization of monthly plenary meetings, award ceremonies for the winners of academic prizes, symposia and other working sessions;
- the work of numerous advisory committees;
- the new statutes and organic regulations of 2008 introduced a number of important reforms, including the election of its members. It now chooses its members by election, following a selection procedure organized and coordinated by a twelve-member Selection Committee comprising the Board and the chairmen of the six sections;
- it publishes the Bulletin et Mémoires de l'Académie royale de Médecine de Belgique (Bulletin and Memoirs of the Royal Academy of Medicine of Belgium), containing mainly proceedings and minutes of meetings, as well as dissertations awarded prizes in various competitions;
- eminent personalities from the world of medical science, chosen by the Board of Directors, frequently take to the podium to present their work at public meetings. Young researchers and outside personalities are also welcome to present their work;
- the Académie contributes to the progress of the various branches of medicine, notably by awarding prizes to researchers whose work has been distinguished;
- the academy awards prizes to future clinician-researchers and supports applied scientific research, in collaboration with the National Fund for Scientific Research (FNRS).

== Operation ==
The Royal Academy of Medicine is under the authority of a "Bureau" consisting of a President, a Perpetual Secretary (who administers the academy), two vice-presidents, and two assessors. Two representatives of ordinary members also sit on the Bureau with advisory votes. The President and the two vice-presidents are elected, for one year, from among and by the full members. The perpetual secretary is appointed by the government of the French Community, on the proposal of the full members, for a term of five years. The Perpetual Secretary has the right to serve a second five-year term. If the perpetual secretary reaches the age of 75, his term ends on his birthday.

The academy is divided into six sections covering various fields of medicine (human and animal). It has six categories of members for which various age limits have been set:

- Full members (40)
- Ordinary members (60)
- Honorary members
- Honorary members (honoris causa)
- Foreign members (90)
- Honorary foreign members.

== Notable members ==
- Jacques Brotchi – professor of neurosurgery
- Miriam Cnop – researcher and physician specializing in diabetology
- Christian de Duve – Nobel Prize-winning Belgian cytologist and biochemist
- Michel A. J. Georges – biologist and professor at the University of Liège
- Joseph Guislain – physician and a psychiatrist
- Benoît Lengelé – physician, surgeon, and anatomist
- Françoise Meunier – medical doctor and former director general of the European Organisation for Research and Treatment of Cancer (EORTC)
- Marc Parmentier – scientist and researcher of G protein-coupled receptors (GPCR), and of transgenic models of human pathologies
- Etienne Pays – molecular biologist and professor at the Universite Libre de Bruxelles
- Martine Piccart – medical oncologist
