= Arglabin =

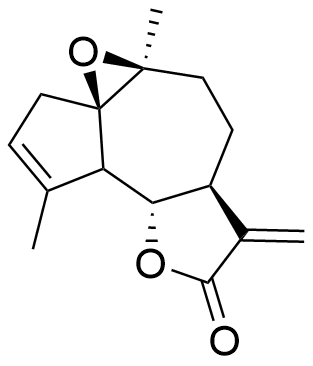

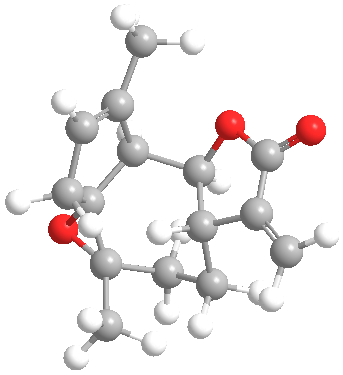

Names
- Preferred IUPAC name (3aR,4aS,6aS,9aS,9bR)-1,4a-Dimethyl-7-methylidene-5,6,6a,7,9a,9b-hexahydro-3H-oxireno[2′,3′:8,8a]azuleno[4,5-b]furan-8(4aH)-one

Identifiers
CAS Number	84692-91-1
3D model (JSmol)	Interactive image
ChEBI	CHEBI:73228
ChemSpider	4614428
PubChem CID	636760
UNII	YS8UOP7QZ1
CompTox Dashboard (EPA)	DTXSID30233687
- InChI: InChI=1S/C15H18O3/c1-8-4-7-15-11(8)12-10(9(2)13(16)17-12)5-6-14(15,3)18-15/h4,10-12H,2,5-7H2,1,3H3/t10-,11-,12-,14-,15+/m0/s1 Key: UVJYAKBJSGRTHA-ZCRGAIPPSA-N
- SMILES: CC1=CCC23C1C4C(CCC2(O3)C)C(=C)C(=O)O4

Properties
Chemical formula	C_{15}H_{18}O_{3}
Molar mass	246.306 g·mol^{−1}
Melting point	100–102 °C (212–216 °F; 373–375 K)
- Except where otherwise noted, data are given for materials in their standard state (at 25 °C [77 °F], 100 kPa). Infobox references

Arglabin is a sesquiterpene lactone belonging to the guaianolide subclass bearing a 5,7,5-tricyclic ring system which is known to inhibit farnesyl transferase. It is characterized by an epoxide on the cycloheptane as well as an exocyclic methylene group that is conjugated with the carbonyl of the lactone. Arglabin is extracted from Artemisia glabella, a species of wormwood, found in the Karaganda Region of Kazakhstan. Arglabin and its derivatives are biologically active and demonstrate promising antitumor activity and cytoxocity against varying tumor cell lines.

== Isolation and structure elucidation ==
The isolation of arglabin was first reported in 1982 by Adekenov et al. It is isolated from the epigeal portion of the Artemisia glabella plant, also known as a smooth wormwood, commonly found in the Kent mountains of Kazakhstan. Arglabin can also be found in A. myiantha, a plant commonly used in traditional Chinese medicine. Adekenov et al. analyzed chloroform extracts and found that the new sesquiterpene lactone had a melting point of 100-102 °C, a molecular composition of C_{15}H_{18}O_{3}, and [α]^{20}_{D} +45.6. IR spectroscopy analysis revealed peaks at 1760 cm^{−1} corresponding to the carbonyl of a γ-lactone and 1660 cm^{−1} corresponding to C=C. UV spectroscopy reveals absorption at 204 nm with an ε of 19,800 which is characteristic of an exocyclic methylene that is conjugated with the γ-lactone carbonyl. Mass spectroscopy data showed fragments with m/z of 231 which corresponds to a methyl group attached to an epoxide, 213 (M-CH_{2}-H_{2}O)^{+}, 203 (M-CH_{3}-CO)^{+}, and 185 (M-CH_{3}-H_{2}O-CO)^{+}. Further determination of the epoxide was done by opening the epoxide and analyzing its spectroscopy data. The structure was further elucidated by NMR spectroscopy in CDCl_{3}. The exocyclic methylene was present at 6.10 ppm with J=3 Hz. By using the physiochemical constants and comparing NMR spectra from other sesquiterpene lactones that were isolated, Adekenov et al. proposed the structure and the stereochemistry was confirmed using X-ray crystallography.

== Biosynthesis ==
Arglabin belongs to the guaianolide subclass of sesquiterpene lactones which have a characteristic bicyclo[5.3.0]decane skeleton with a lactone inserted either at C-6 or C-7. A few biomimetic semisynthetic studies have described several sesquiterpene lactones as possible precursors to arglabin, such as parthenolide, micheliolide, and kauniolide. Although the detailed biosynthetic pathway of arglabin has yet to be elucidated, the biosynthetic pathway for guaianolides has been extensively studied. It is widely believed that most terpenes are derived from the biochemically active isoprene units, isopentenyl pyrophosphate (IPP) and γ,γ-dimethylallyl pyrophosphate (DMAPP). There are two possible pathways that produce these two important precursors, the mevalonate pathway (MVA) which occurs in the cytosol and the methylerythritol phosphate pathway (MEP) or non-mevalonate pathway, which occurs in plastids.

IPP and DMAPP are then connected in a head-to-tail fashion to form the backbone of terpenes. Ionization of DMAPP forms the allylic cation which the double bond of IPP regioselectively adds to form the tertiary cation. Subsequent stereospecific deprotonation will form the geranyl pyrophosphate (GPP) intermediate, a vital intermediate for the biosynthesis of monoterpenes. Further repetition of the process would give rise to farnesyl pyrophosphate (FPP) which, more specifically, is the precursor for linear and cyclic sesquiterpenes and more importantly the sesquiterpene lactones. FPP is then cyclized to form (+)-germacrene A. (Fig. 1)

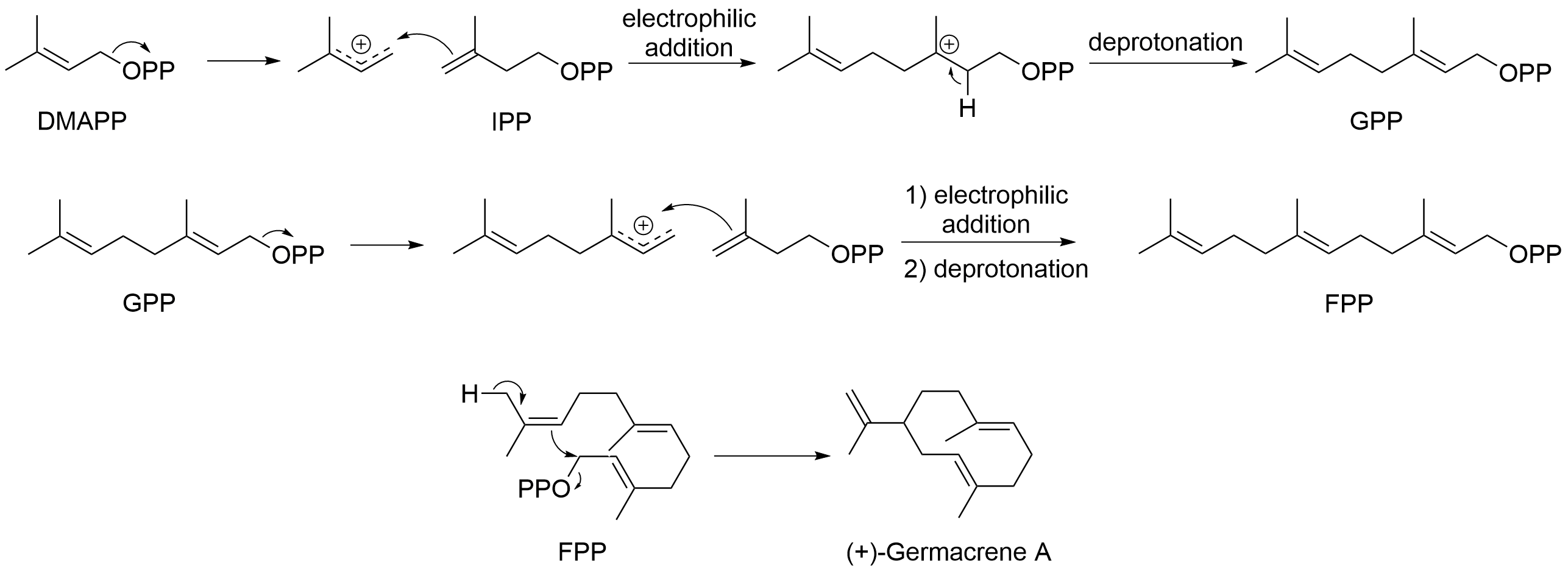

Fig. 1. The cyclization of FPP to yield the (+)-costunolide precursor, Germacrene A.

Following the formation of the 10-member ring system of (+)-germacrene A, two subsequent oxidation steps formed germacrene acid. Germacrene acid could then be hydroxylated and undergo lactonization to form (+)-costunolide, a branching point for the biosynthesis of sesquiterpene lactones. (Fig. 2) From here, the biosynthesis of guaianolides can follow two proposed pathways. In the first pathway, (+)-costunolide undergoes enzymatic epoxidation forming parthenolide. Parthenolide undergoes trans-annular cyclization and elimination to form the guaianolide skeleton. The second pathway includes the enzymatic hydroxylation of (+)-costunolide followed by dehydration and cyclization to give the guaianolide skeleton. (Fig. 3) Further epoxiation of the guaianolide skeleton would yield the desired sesquiterpene lactone, arglabin.

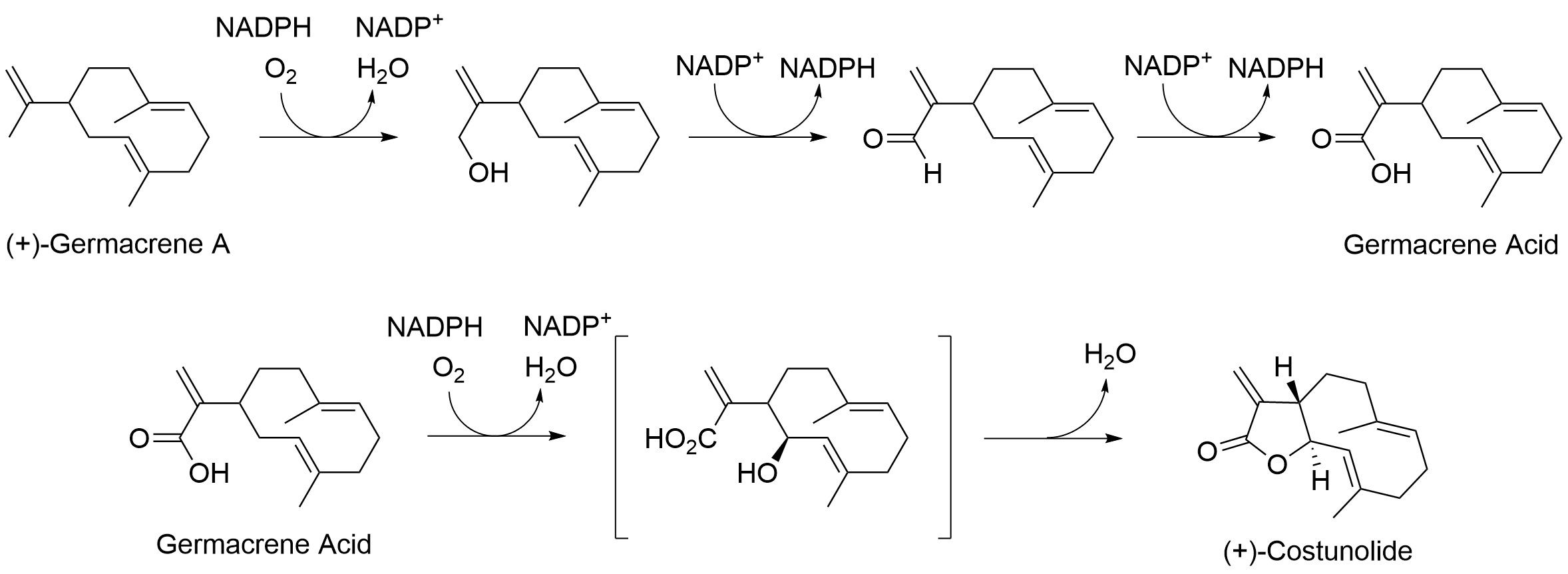

Fig. 2. Subsequent oxidation followed by lactonization to form (+)-costunolide, a precursor for the guaianolide skeleton.

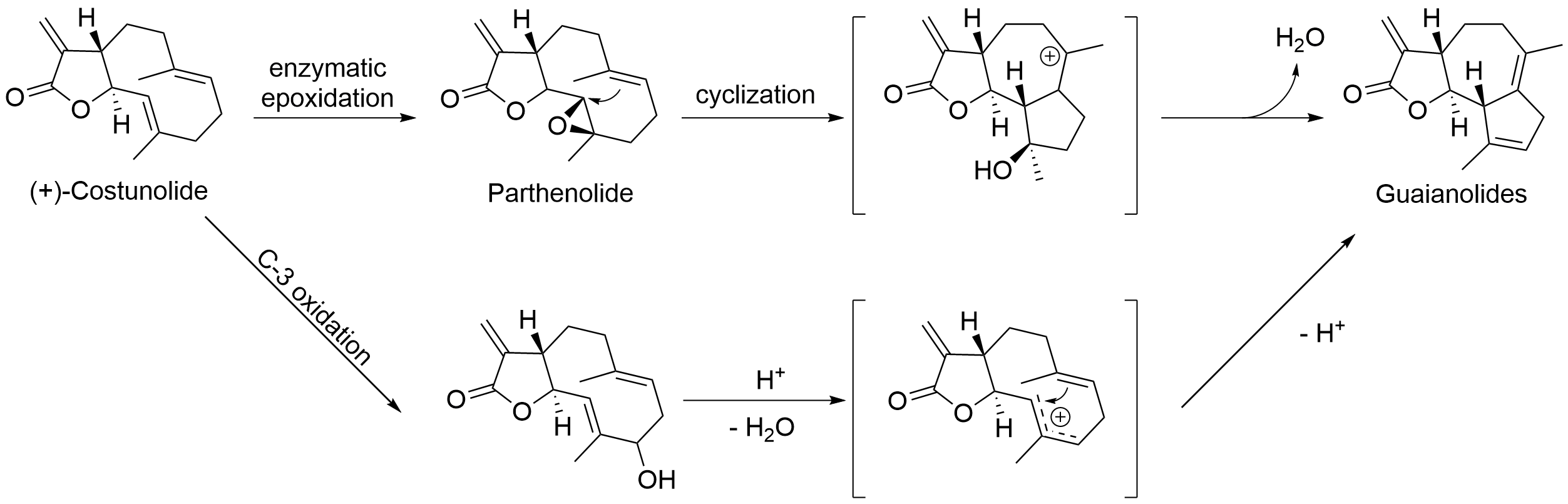

Fig.3. The two possible pathways for the formation of the guaianolide skeleton from the (+)-costunolide precursor.

== Biological activity ==
Guaianolides are known to exhibit significant biological activity. The plants containing such compounds have been a source for traditional medicine to treat a wide variety of ailments such ranging from rheumatic pain, pulmonary disorders, and increasing bile production. It is generally believed that the α-methylene-γ-lactone moiety is the functional group responsible for the biological activity in guaianolides due to its interaction with biological nuecleophiles. In 2004, Zhangabylov et al. ran an in vivo study on arglabin and reported its ability to inhibit DNA synthesis of the P388 lymphocytic leukemia cells. In 2012, Yindgai Gao and Yue Chen tested arglabin for biological activity against acute myelogenous leukemia (AML). Their results showed that arglabin exhibited activities against the cultured AML cell line, HL-60, and the doxorubicin-resistant cell line, HL-60/A. The activity was comparable to parthenolide, a current treatment for AML. Furthermore, arglabin is being tested as an anticancer drug for the treatment of breast, liver, and lung cancer due to its ability to inhibit farnesyl transferase which leads to the activation of RAS proto-oncogene, pivotal in human tumors. Arglabin has also shown to reduce inflammation induced by atherosclerosis. It also exhibits immunomodulating properties and regulates the production of cytokines such as IL-1, IL-2, and TNF-alpha.
