= List of contaminated cell lines =

List of immortalized cell lines overgrown by other, more aggressive cells

Many cell lines that are widely used for biomedical research have been overgrown by other, more aggressive cells. For example, supposed thyroid lines were actually melanoma cells, supposed prostate tissue was actually bladder cancer, and supposed normal uterine cultures were actually breast cancer. This is a list of cell lines that have been cross-contaminated and overgrown by other cells. Estimates based on screening of leukemia-lymphoma cell lines suggest that about 15% of these cell lines are not representative of what they are usually assumed to be. A project is currently underway to enumerate and rename contaminated cell lines to avoid errors in research caused by misattribution. (Note: The original citation was ambiguous on which of these citations was being referenced, so both have been added here.)

Contaminated cell lines have been extensively used in research without knowledge of their true character. For example, most if not all research on the endothelium ECV-304 or the megakaryocyte DAMI cell lines has in reality been conducted on bladder carcinoma and erythroleukemia cells, respectively. Thus, all research on endothelium- or megakaryocyte-specific functions utilizing these cell lines has been misguided.

There are two principal ways in which a cell line can become contaminated: cell cultures are often exchanged between research groups; if, during handling, a sample is contaminated and then passed on, subsequent exchanges of cells will lead to the contaminating population being established, although parts of the supposed cell line are still genuine. More serious is contamination at the source: during establishment of the original cell line, some contaminating cells are accidentally introduced into the cultures, where they in time outgrow the desired cells. In this case, the initial testing still suggests that the cell line is genuine and novel, but in reality, it disappeared soon after being established, and all samples of such cell lines are actually the contaminating cells. Lengthy research is required to determine the precise points where cell lines became contaminated. A mix-up rated as contamination could in reality be a simple confusion of two cell lines, but usually contamination is assumed.

After a cell line has been discovered to be contaminated, it is usually never used again for research demanding the specific type of cell line they were assumed to be. Most contaminated cell lines are discarded; however, sometimes contaminant cells have acquired novel characteristics (e.g., by mutation or viral transfection, for example the HeLa derivate Det98) and thus constitute a truly novel lineage, so they are not thrown away. If a cell line is thought to be contaminated, it is usually tested for authenticity. (Note: The citations of this article contain some papers on how common contaminates can be recognized.) The widespread contamination of HeLa cells was initially recognized by Walter Nelson-Rees using simple Giemsa stain karyotyping under a light microscope. This technique works well in recognizing HeLa because these cells have distinctive chromosome aberrations. Novel cell lines are proliferated and distributed and/or deposited at a safekeeping institution such as the ATCC as soon as possible after establishment to minimize the odds that the line becomes spoiled by contamination. It is considered good practice to periodically check cell lines maintained under laboratory conditions (i.e., not placed in long-term storage) for contamination with HeLa or other common contaminants to ensure that their quality and integrity are maintained.

== Lists of contaminated cell lines ==
This list, containing 488 cell lines, was last updated on 1 December 2016. (Note: An updated list can be obtained from International Cell Line Authentication Committee website.)

Cellosaurus also is maintaining a list of "problematic" cell lines. The list is dynamically generated from all cell lines in the database with a comment containing the dedicated words "Problematic cell line". As of 17 January 2017, the list contains 757 entries.

If no species is given in the individual entries of the following tables, the table's species applies to both the assumed and the actual cell types.

Cell lines marked Virtual in the table below are known instances of contamination at the source; these cell lines became extinct or never existed. Cases where non-contaminated lines are known or strongly suspected to exist are marked Existent.

=== Contaminated human cell lines ===
| Supposed cell line | Existent? | Supposed cell type | Real cell line | Real cell type | Reference | Cellosaurus |
|---|---|---|---|---|---|---|
| 207 | Existent | pre-B cell leukemia | REH or CCRF-CEM | pre-B cell or T cell leukemia | | CVCL_K034 |
| 2474/90 | Virtual | stomach carcinoma | HT-29 | colon carcinoma | | CVCL_9556 |
| 2563, MAC-21 | | lung lymphoma | HeLa | cervical adenocarcinoma | | CVCL_M629, CVCL_M627 |
| 2957/90 | Virtual | stomach carcinoma | HT-29 | colon carcinoma | | CVCL_9557 |
| 3051/80 | Virtual | stomach carcinoma | HT-29 | colon carcinoma | | CVCL_9558 |
| ADLC-5M2 | Virtual | lung carcinoma | HeLa | cervical adenocarcinoma | | CVCL_8169 |
| AG-F | Virtual | Hodgkin's disease | CCRF-CEM variant | T cell leukemia | | CVCL_D101 |
| AO | Virtual | amnion | HeLa | cervical adenocarcinoma | | CVCL_D631 |
| ARH-77 | Existent? | plasma cell leukemia | unknown | Epstein-Barr virus-transfected B cell lymphoblastoid | | CVCL_1072 |
| AV_{3} | Virtual | amnion | HeLa | cervical adenocarcinoma | | CVCL_1904 |
| BCC1/KMC | Virtual | basal cell carcinoma | HeLa | cervical adenocarcinoma | | CVCL_A033 |
| BE-13 | Virtual | T cell leukemia | PEER | T cell leukemia | Drexler et al. (2003) | CVCL_1081 |
| BJA-B | Existent | Burkitt's lymphoma | REH | pre-B cell leukemia | Drexler et al. (2003) | CVCL_5711 |
| BLIN-1, -1E8 | Virtual | pre-B cell leukemia | NALM-6 | pre-B cell leukemia | Drexler et al. (2003) | CVCL_8173 |
| BM-1604 | Virtual | prostate carcinoma | DU-145 | prostate carcinoma | | CVCL_1968 |
| BrCa 5 | Virtual | breast carcinoma | HeLa | cervical adenocarcinoma | | CVCL_D280 |
| BT-20 | Existent | breast carcinoma | HeLa | cervical adenocarcinoma | | CVCL_0178 |
| CaMa (cl 15) | Virtual | breast carcinoma | unknown | Laboratory mouse/Golden hamster cells | | CVCL_1T14 |
| CaOV | Virtual | ovarian carcinoma | HeLa | cervical adenocarcinoma | | CVCL_M091 |
| CaVe | Virtual | stomach carcinoma | HeLa | cervical adenocarcinoma | | CVCL_8444 |
| Chang liver | | liver | HeLa | cervical adenocarcinoma | ; Lacroix (2008) | CVCL_0238 |
| CHB | Virtual | astrocytoma | unknown | Laboratory rat glial cells? | | CVCL_1R45 |
| CMP, CMPII C2 | Virtual | intestinal adenocarcinoma | HeLa | cervical adenocarcinoma | | CVCL_D297 CVCL_L115 |
| CO (COLE) | Virtual | Hodgkin's disease | CCRF-CEM | T cell leukemia | | CVCL_J653 |
| COLO-818 | Virtual | melanoma | COLO-800 | melanoma | | CVCL_1998 |
| D18T | Virtual | synovial cell | HeLa | cervical adenocarcinoma | | CVCL_8669 |
| DAMI | Virtual | megakaryocytic | HEL | erythroleukemia | MacLeod et al. (1997a, b) | CVCL_4360 |
| DAPT | Virtual | pilocytic astrocytoma | HeLa | cervical adenocarcinoma | | CVCL_D279 |
| Detroit 6 (Det6) | Virtual | sternal marrow | HeLa | cervical adenocarcinoma | | CVCL_2436 |
| Detroit 30A (Det30A) | Virtual | carcinoma ascites | HeLa | cervical adenocarcinoma | | CVCL_8674 |
| Detroit 98 (Det98), Det98/AG, Det98/AH-2, Det98/AHR | Virtual | sternal marrow | HeLa | cervical adenocarcinoma | | CVCL_8188 |
| DD | Virtual | malignant histiocytosis | K-562 | terminal CML | Drexler et al. (2003) | CVCL_J651 |
| EB33 | Virtual | prostate | HeLa | cervical adenocarcinoma | | CVCL_8344 |
| ECV-304 | Virtual | normal endothelium | T-24 | bladder carcinoma | Dirks et al. (1999); Lacroix (2008) | CVCL_2029 |
| EH | Virtual | hairy cell leukemia | HK | hairy cell leukemia | Drexler et al. (2003) | CVCL_L804 |
| ElCo | Virtual | breast carcinoma | HeLa | cervical adenocarcinoma | | CVCL_8686 |
| EPLC-32M1 | Virtual | lung carcinoma | HeLa | cervical adenocarcinoma | | CVCL_8193 |
| EPLC-65H | Virtual | lung carcinoma | HeLa | cervical adenocarcinoma | | CVCL_8194 |
| ESP_{1} | Virtual | Sporadic Burkitt's lymphoma | HeLa | cervical adenocarcinoma | | CVCL_8351 |
| EU-1 | Virtual | pre-B cell leukemia | REH | pre-B cell leukemia | Drexler et al. (2003) | CVCL_8857 |
| EU-7 | Virtual | T cell leukemia | CCRF-CEM | T cell leukemia | Drexler et al. (2003) | CVCL_8865 |
| EUE | Virtual | fetal subcutis | HeLa | cervical adenocarcinoma | | CVCL_7262 |
| EVLC2 | Virtual | transfected umbilical vein endothelium | unknown | non-endothelial? | Unger et al. (2002) | CVCL_8687 |
| F2-4E5 | Virtual | thymus epithelium | SK-HEP-1 | liver carcinoma | | CVCL_A040 |
| F2-5B6 | Virtual | thymus epithelium | SK-HEP-1 | liver carcinoma | | CVCL_A041 |
| F255A4 | Virtual | | HeLa | cervical adenocarcinoma | | CVCL_8688 |
| FL | Virtual | amnion | HeLa | cervical adenocarcinoma | | CVCL_1905 |
| FQ, RB, RY, SpR | Virtual | Hodgkin's disease spleen | OMK-210 | Three-striped night monkey kidney | | CVCL_L984, CVCL_L985, CVCL_U964, CVCL_L986 |
| G-11 | Virtual | breast carcinoma | HeLa | cervical adenocarcinoma | | CVCL_U962 |
| GHE | Virtual | astrocytoma | T-24 | bladder carcinoma | | CVCL_8199 |
| Girardi heart | | heart | HeLa | cervical adenocarcinoma | ; Lacroix (2008) | CVCL_2254 |
| GM01312 | | myeloma | unknown | Epstein-Barr virus-transfected B cell lymphoblastoid | Drexler et al. (2003) | CVCL_J111 |
| GM01500 | | myeloma | unknown | Epstein-Barr virus-transfected B cell lymphoblastoid | Drexler et al. (2003) | CVCL_D870 |
| GREF-X | Virtual | liver myofibroblast | unknown | Laboratory rat cell line | | CVCL_7667 |
| HAEND | | liver angiosarcoma | unknown | non-endothelial? | Unger et al. (2002) | CVCL_8690 |
| hAG | Virtual | adenomatoid goitre | T-24 | bladder carcinoma | | CVCL_8223 |
| HBC | Virtual | infiltrating ductal carcinoma | unknown | Rat cell line | | CVCL_M630 |
| HBT3, HBT-E, HBT-39b | Virtual | breast carcinoma | HeLa | cervical adenocarcinoma | | CVCL_D281, CVCL_M746, CVCL_J652 |
| HCE | Virtual | cervical carcinoma | HeLa | cervical adenocarcinoma | | CVCL_M619 |
| HEK | Virtual | embryonic kidney | HeLa | cervical adenocarcinoma | | CVCL_M624 |
| HEK/HRV | | transfected embryonic kidney | HeLa | cervical adenocarcinoma | | CVCL_M625 |
| HEL-R66 | Virtual | embryonic lung | unknown | Grivet cell line | | CVCL_1R39 |
| HEp-2 | Virtual | larynx epidermoid carcinoma | HeLa | cervical adenocarcinoma | Chen (1988); Lacroix (2008) | CVCL_1906 |
| HIMeg-1 | Existent? | CML | HL-60 | myeloblastic leukemia | Drexler et al. (2003) | CVCL_8439 |
| HKB-1 | Virtual | Hodgkin's disease | unknown | unknown | Drexler et al. (2003) | CVCL_5290 |
| HMV-1 | Virtual | melanoma | HeLa | cervical adenocarcinoma | | CVCL_8233 |
| HPB-ALL | Existent | T cell leukemia | Jurkat | T cell leukemia | Drexler et al. (2003) | CVCL_1820 |
| HPB-MLT | Virtual | T cell leukemia | HPB-ALL | T cell leukemia | Drexler et al. (2003) | CVCL_7959 |
| hPTC | Virtual | papillary thyroid carcinoma | unknown | Domestic pig cell line | | CVCL_8224 |
| HS-445 | | Hodgkin's disease | unknown | Epstein-Barr virus-transfected B cell lymphoblastoid | Drexler et al. (2003) | CVCL_0761 |
| HS-Sultan | Virtual | multiple myeloma plasmacytoma | Jijoye | Endemic Burkitt's lymphoma | Drexler et al. (2001) | CVCL_2516 |
| HuK°39 | Virtual | kidney | HeLa | cervical adenocarcinoma | | CVCL_8283 |
| HuT | Virtual | fibrosarcoma-derived cell line 8387 | HeLa | cervical adenocarcinoma | | CVCL_M861 |
| IM-9 | | multiple myeloma | unknown | Epstein-Barr virus-transfected B cell lymphoblastoid | ; Lacroix (2008) | CVCL_1305 |
| IMC-2 | Virtual | maxillary carcinoma | HeLa | cervical adenocarcinoma | | CVCL_8245 |
| Intestine 407 (INT 407) | Virtual | intestinal epithelium | HeLa | cervical adenocarcinoma | ; Lacroix (2008) | CVCL_1907 |
| J96 | Virtual | leukemic blood | HeLa | cervical adenocarcinoma | | CVCL_3990 |
| J111 | Virtual | monocytic leukemia | HeLa | cervical adenocarcinoma | ; Lacroix (2008) | CVCL_2965 |
| JHC | Virtual | placenta | HeLa | cervical adenocarcinoma | | CVCL_M093 |
| JHT | Virtual | transfected placenta | HeLa | cervical adenocarcinoma | | CVCL_M620 |
| JOSK-I, -K, -M, -S | Virtual | monocytic leukemia | U-937 | histiocytic lymphoma | | CVCL_2082, CVCL_81411, CVCL_2083, CVCL_8142 |
| K051 | Existent? | myeloblastic leukemia | K-562 | terminal CML | Drexler et al. (2003) | CVCL_3000 |
| Karpas 45 | Existent | T cell leukemia | unknown | unknown | | CVCL_1326 |
| KB | Virtual | oral carcinoma | HeLa | cervical adenocarcinoma | ; Lacroix (2008) | CVCL_0372 |
| KBM-3 | Existent | monocytic leukemia | HL-60 | myeloblastic leukemia | Drexler et al. (2003) | CVCL_A425 |
| KE-37 | Existent | T cell leukemia | CCRF-CEM | T cell leukemia | | CVCL_1327 |
| KM-3 | Existent? | pre-B cell leukemia | REH | pre-B cell leukemia | | CVCL_0011 |
| KMS-21-BM | Existent? | myeloma | unknown | unknown | Drexler et al. (2003) | CVCL_2991 |
| KPB-M15 | Virtual | terminal CML | KYO-1 | terminal CML | Drexler et al. (2003) | CVCL_5308 |
| KP-P_{1} | Virtual | prostate carcinoma | HeLa | cervical adenocarcinoma | | CVCL_D283 |
| L132 | Virtual | embryonic lung epithelium | HeLa | cervical adenocarcinoma | ; Lacroix (2008) | CVCL_1908 |
| L-540 | Existent | Hodgkin's disease | CCRF-CEM | T cell leukemia | Drexler et al. (2003) | CVCL_1362 |
| L-591 | Existent? | Hodgkin's disease | unknown | Epstein-Barr virus-transfected B cell lymphoblastoid | Drexler et al. (2003) | CVCL_1867 |
| LED-Ti | | cervical carcinoma | HeLa | cervical adenocarcinoma | | CVCL_8438 |
| LR10.6 | Virtual | pre-B cell leukemia | NALM-6 | pre-B cell leukemia | | CVCL_8260 |
| LU | Virtual | fetal lung | HeLa | cervical adenocarcinoma | | CVCL_M631 |
| LU 106 | Virtual | embryonic lung | HeLa | cervical adenocarcinoma | | CVCL_8892 |
| M10T | Virtual | synovial cell | HeLa | cervical adenocarcinoma | | CVCL_M094 |
| MA160 | Virtual | prostate | HeLa | cervical adenocarcinoma | | CVCL_8261 |
| MaTu | Virtual | breast carcinoma | HeLa | cervical adenocarcinoma | | CVCL_5328 |
| MB-02 | Existent | megakaryoblastic leukemia | HU-3 | megakaryoblastic leukemia | | CVCL_7075 |
| MC-4000 | Virtual | breast carcinoma | HeLa | cervical adenocarcinoma | | CVCL_5331 |
| MC/CAR | | plasma cell leukemia | unknown | Epstein-Barr virus-transfected B cell lymphoblastoid | | CVCL_1397 |
| McCoy | Virtual | synovial cell | Strain L | Laboratory mouse connective tissue | | CVCL_3742 |
| MDA-MB-435 | Virtual | breast carcinoma | M14 | melanoma | Ellison et al. J Clin Pathol Mol Pathol 55, 294-9; Lacroix (2008) | CVCL_0417 |
| MDS | Virtual | monocytic leukemia | Jurkat | T cell leukemia | Drexler et al. (2003) | CVCL_L807 |
| MHH-225 | Existent? | megakaryoblastic leukemia | Jurkat | T cell leukemia | Drexler et al. (2003) | CVCL_8894 |
| Minnesota EE | Virtual | esophageal epithelium | HeLa | cervical adenocarcinoma | | CVCL_8264 |
| MKB-1 | Virtual | T cell leukemia | CCRF-CEM | T cell leukemia | | CVCL_8265 |
| MOBS-1 | Virtual | monocytic leukemia | U-937 | histiocytic lymphoma | | CVCL_8442 |
| MOLT-15 | Virtual | T cell leukemia | CTV-1 | monocytic leukemia | | CVCL_8150 |
| MT-1 | Virtual | breast carcinoma | HeLa | cervical adenocarcinoma | ; Lacroix (2008) | CVCL_0441 |
| MUTZ-1 | Virtual | T cell leukemia | Namalwa | Burkitt's lymphoma | | CVCL_1431 |
| NCTC2544, NCTC3075 | Virtual | skin epithelium | HeLa | cervical adenocarcinoma | ; Lacroix (2008) | CVCL_0461, CVCL_8156 |
| NCI-ADR-RES | Virtual | breast cancer | OVCAR-8 | high grade serous ovarian cancer | Liscovitch & Ravid (2007) | CVCL_1452 |
| NOI-90 | Virtual | natural killer cell lymphoma | REH | pre-B cell leukemia | Drexler et al. (2003) | CVCL_8462 |
| OE | Virtual | endometrium | HeLa | cervical adenocarcinoma | | CVCL_J350 |
| OU-AML-1, -2. -3, -4, -5, -6, -7, -8 | Virtual | acute myeloid leukemia | OCI/AML2 | monocytic leukemia | Drexler et al. (2003) | CVCL_8391, CVCL_8392, CVCL_8393, CVCL_8394, CVCL_8395, CVCL_8396, CVCL_8397, CVCL_8398 |
| P1-1A3 | Virtual | thymus epithelium | SK-HEP-1 | liver carcinoma | | CVCL_A042 |
| P1-4D6 | Virtual | thymus epithelium | SK-HEP-1 | liver carcinoma | | CVCL_A046 |
| P39/Tsugane | Existent | myeloblastic leukemia | HL-60 | myeloblastic leukemia | Drexler et al. (2003) | CVCL_0478 |
| PBEI | Virtual | pre-B cell leukemia | NALM-6 | pre-B cell leukemia | | CVCL_8270 |
| PLB-985 | Virtual | monocytic leukemia | HL-60 | myeloblastic leukemia | Drexler et al. (2003) | CVCL_2162 |
| RAMAK-1 | Virtual | muscle synovium | T-24 | bladder carcinoma | | CVCL_8271 |
| RBHF-1 | Virtual | hepatoma | unknown | non-human mammal cell line | | CVCL_Y465 |
| RC-2A | Existent? | monocytic leukemia | CCRF-CEM | T cell leukemia | | CVCL_L808 |
| RED-3 | Virtual | acute myeloid leukemia | HL-60 | myeloblastic leukemia | Drexler et al. (2003) | CVCL_8907 |
| REH-6 | Virtual | pre-B cell leukemia | unknown | Laboratory mouse cell line | | CVCL_L803 |
| RM-10 | Virtual | terminal CML | K-562 | terminal CML | | CVCL_8463 |
| RPMI-6666 | | Hodgkin's disease | unknown | Epstein-Barr virus-transfected B cell lymphoblastoid | Drexler et al. (2003) | CVCL_1665 |
| RPMI-8402 | Existent | T cell leukemia | unknown | unknown | ; Lacroix (2008) | CVCL_1667 |
| RS-1 | Existent? | megakaryoblastic leukemia | K-562 | terminal CML | Drexler et al. (2003) | CVCL_8423 |
| Rsp | | Hodgkin's disease | unknown | Epstein-Barr virus-transfected B cell lymphoblastoid | Drexler et al. (2003) | CVCL_M628 |
| RT4 | Existent | bladder carcinoma | HeLa | cervical adenocarcinoma | | CVCL_0036 |
| SA4 | Virtual | liposarcoma | HeLa | cervical adenocarcinoma | | CVCL_8910 |
| SAM-1 | Virtual | terminal CML | K-562 | terminal CML | Drexler et al. (2003) | CVCL_8440 |
| SBC-2 | Virtual | bladder carcinoma | HeLa | cervical adenocarcinoma | | CVCL_1677 |
| SBC-7 | Virtual | bladder carcinoma | HeLa | cervical adenocarcinoma | | CVCL_1680 |
| SCLC-16H, -24H | Virtual | small cell lung carcinoma | SCLC-21/22H | small cell lung carcinoma | | CVCL_X025, CVCL_8262 |
| SH-2 | Virtual | breast carcinoma | HeLa | cervical adenocarcinoma | | CVCL_M622 |
| SH-3 | Virtual | breast carcinoma | HeLa | cervical adenocarcinoma | | CVCL_M383 |
| SPI-801, -802 | Virtual | T cell leukemia | K-562 | terminal CML | | CVCL_2200, CVCL_2201 |
| SR-91 | Virtual | T cell leukemia | AML-193 | monocytic leukemia | Drexler et al. (2003) | CVCL_8441 |
| SW-527 | Virtual | tumor | SW-480/SW-620 | colon adenocarcinoma | | CVCL_3799 |
| SW-598 | Virtual | tumor | SW-480/SW-620 | colon adenocarcinoma | | CVCL_F649 |
| SW-608 | Virtual | tumor | SW-480/SW-620 | colon adenocarcinoma | | CVCL_F653 |
| SW-613 | Virtual | tumor | SW-480/SW-620 | colon adenocarcinoma | | CVCL_F650 |
| SW-732 | Virtual | tumor | SW-480/SW-620 | colon adenocarcinoma | | CVCL_F651 |
| SW-733 | Virtual | tumor | SW-480/SW-620 | colon adenocarcinoma | | CVCL_F652 |
| T-1 | Virtual | kidney | HeLa | cervical adenocarcinoma | | CVCL_M858 |
| T-9 | Virtual | transfected somatic | HeLa | cervical adenocarcinoma | | CVCL_M092 |
| T-33 | Existent? | terminal CML | K-562 | terminal CML | Drexler et al. (2003) | CVCL_8427 |
| TDL-1, TDL-2 | Virtual | tonsil lymphoid | P3JHR-1 | Burkitt's lymphoma | | CVCL_8428, CVCL_8429 |
| TDL-3 | Virtual | tonsil lymphoid | RPMI-1788 | lymphoblastoid | | CVCL_8430 |
| TDL-4 | Virtual | tonsil lymphoid | Raji | Burkitt's lymphoma | | CVCL_8431 |
| TI-1 | Virtual | myeloblastic leukemia | K-562 | terminal CML | Drexler et al. (2003) | CVCL_L806 |
| TMM | | terminal CML | unknown | Epstein-Barr virus-transfected B cell lymphoblastoid | | CVCL_1894 |
| TuWi | Virtual | Wilms' Tumor | HeLa | cervical adenocarcinoma | | CVCL_8275 |
| U-937 | Existent | histiocytic lymphoma | unknown | unknown | | CVCL_0007 |
| UMJF-2 | | myeloma | unknown | Epstein-Barr virus-transfected B cell lymphoblastoid | Drexler et al. (2003) | CVCL_M548 |
| UT-7 | Existent | histiocytic lymphoma | unknown | unknown | | CVCL_2233 |
| UTMB-460 | Virtual | B cell | CCRF-CEM | T cell leukemia | Drexler et al. (2003) | CVCL_8276 |
| WISH | Virtual | amnion | HeLa | cervical adenocarcinoma | ; Lacroix (2008) | CVCL_1909 |
| Wong-Kilbourne | Virtual | conjunctiva | HeLa | cervical adenocarcinoma | ; Lacroix (2008) | CVCL_2764 |
| WSU-ALCL | Virtual | Anaplastic large cell lymphoma | CCRF-CEM | T cell leukemia | Drexler et al. (2003) | CVCL_A036 |
| WSU-CLL | Virtual | B cell leukemia | REH | pre-B cell leukemia | Drexler et al. (2002a) | CVCL_A049 |
| YAA | Virtual | monocyte | U-937 | histiocytic lymphoma | Drexler et al. (2003) | CVCL_8466 |
| YAP | Virtual | monocyte | U-937 | histiocytic lymphoma | Drexler et al. (2003) | CVCL_8467 |
| YJ | Virtual | monocytic leukemia | HL-60 | myeloblastic leukemia | Drexler et al. (2003) | CVCL_8931 |

=== Contaminated non-human cell lines ===
| Supposed cell line | Existent? | Supposed cell type | Real cell line | Real cell type | Reference | Cellosaurus |
|---|---|---|---|---|---|---|
| GPS-M, GPS-PD | | Guinea pig spleen | Strain L-M | Laboratory mouse connective tissue | | CVCL_1R31, CVCL_1R32 |
| LT-1 | | Leopard frog renal adenocarcinoma | TH-1/FHM | Eastern box turtle heart / Fathead minnow epithelium | | CVCL_1R49 |

== Bibliography ==
- Chen, TR (1988). "Re-evaluation of HeLa, HeLa S3, and HEp-2 karyotypes". Cytogenet Cell Genet. 48 (1): 19–24. doi:10.1159/000132579. PMID 3180844.
- Dirks, Willy G.; MacLeod, Roderick A. F.; Drexler, Hans G. (1999). "ECV304 (endothelial) is really T24 (bladder carcinoma): cell line cross-contamination at source". In Vitro Cellular & Developmental Biology. 35 (10): 558–559. doi:10.1007/s11626-999-0091-8. PMID 10614862. S2CID 31347874.
- Drexler, Hans G.; Dirks, Willy G.; MacLeod, Roderick A. F. (1999). "False human hematopoietic cell lines: cross-contaminations and misinterpretations". Leukemia. 13 (10): 1601–1607. doi:10.1038/sj.leu.2401510. PMID 10516762.
- Drexler, Hans G.; MacLeod, Roderick A. F.; Dirks, Willy G. (2001). "Cross-contamination: HS-Sultan is not a myeloma but a Burkitt lymphoma cell line" (PDF). Blood. 98 (12): 3495–3496. doi:10.1182/blood.v98.12.3495. PMID 11732505. S2CID 42238147.
- Drexler, Hans G.; Quentmeier, H.; Dirks, Willy G.; Uphoff, Cord C.; MacLeod, Roderick A. F. (2002a). "DNA profiling and cytogenetic analysis of cell line WSU-CLL reveal cross-contamination with cell line REH (pre B-ALL)". Leukemia. 16 (9): 1868–1870. doi:10.1038/sj.leu.2402610. PMID 12200708.
- Drexler, Hans G.; Uphoff, Cord C.; Dirks, Willy G.; MacLeod, Roderick A. F. (2002b). "Mix-ups and mycoplasma: the enemies within". Leukemia Research. 26 (4): 329–333. doi:10.1016/S0145-2126(01)00136-9. PMID 11839374.
- Drexler, Hans G.; Dirks, Willy G.; Matsuo, Y.; MacLeod, Roderick A. F. (2003). "False leukemia–lymphoma cell lines: an update on over 500 cell lines". Leukemia. 17 (2): 416–426. doi:10.1038/sj.leu.2402799. PMID 12592342.
- Lacroix, Marc (2008). "Persistent use of "false" cell lines". International Journal of Cancer. 122 (1): 1–4. doi:10.1002/ijc.23233. PMID 17960586.
- Liscovitch, Mordechai; Ravid, Dana (January 2007). "A case study in misidentification of cancer cell lines: MCF-7/AdrR cells (re-designated NCI/ADR-RES) are derived from OVCAR-8 human ovarian carcinoma cells". Cancer Letters. 245 (1–2): 350–352. doi:10.1016/j.canlet.2006.01.013. PMID 16504380.
- MacLeod, Roderick A. F.; Dirks, Willy G.; Drexler, Hans G. (1997a). "Early Contamination of the Dami Cell Line by HEL". Blood. 90 (7): 2850–2851. doi:10.1182/blood.v90.7.2850.2850_2850_2850. PMID 9326259.
- MacLeod, Roderick A. F.; Dirks, Willy G.; Reid, Y. A.; Hay, R. J.; Drexler, Hans G. (1997b). "Identity of original and late passage Dami megakaryocytes with HEL erythroleukemia cells shown by combined cytogenetics and DNA fingerprinting". Leukemia. 11 (12): 2032–2038. doi:10.1038/sj.leu.2400868. PMID 9447816.
- MacLeod, Roderick A. F.; Dirks, Willy G.; Matsuo, Y.; Kaufmann, M.; Milch, H.; Drexler, Hans G. (1999). "Widespread intraspecies cross-contamination of human tumor cell lines arising at source". International Journal of Cancer. 83 (4): 555–563. doi:10.1002/(sici)1097-0215(19991112)83:4<555::aid-ijc19>3.0.co;2-2. PMID 10508494.
- Masters, John R (2002). "HeLa cells 50 years on: the good, the bad and the ugly". Nature Reviews Cancer. 2 (4): 315–319. doi:10.1038/nrc775. PMID 12001993. S2CID 991019.
- Nelson-Rees, W. A.; Flandermeyer, R. R. (1976). "HeLa cultures defined". Science. 191 (4222): 96–98. Bibcode:1976Sci...191...96N. doi:10.1126/science.1246601. PMID 1246601.
- Nelson-Rees, W. A.; Daniels, D. W.; Flandermeyer, R. R. (1981). "Cross-contamination of cells in culture". Science. 212 (4493): 446–452. Bibcode:1981Sci...212..446N. doi:10.1126/science.6451928. PMID 6451928.
- Unger, Ronald E.; Krump-Konvalinkova, V.; Peters, K.; Kirkpatrick, C. J. (2002). "In Vitro Expression of the Endothelial Phenotype: Comparative Study of Primary Isolated Cells and Cell Lines, Including the Novel Cell Line HPMEC-ST1.6R". Microvascular Research. 64 (3): 384–397. doi:10.1006/mvre.2002.2434. PMID 12453433.
