= Walter Nelson =

Walter Nelson may refer to:

- Duke Nelson (Walter John Nelson), American college athletics coach and administrator
- Walter "Papoose" Nelson, American R&B guitarist

== See also ==
- Walter Nelson-Rees, cell culture worker and cytogeneticist
