= Contamination =

Presence of an unwanted element

Contamination is the presence of a constituent, impurity, or some other undesirable element that renders something unsuitable, unfit or harmful for the physical body, natural environment, workplace, etc.

== Types of contamination ==
Within the sciences, the word "contamination" can take on a variety of subtle differences in meaning, whether the contaminant is a solid or a liquid, as well as the variance of environment the contaminant is found to be in. A contaminant may even be more abstract, as in the case of an unwanted energy source that may interfere with a process. The following represent examples of different types of contamination based on these and other variances.

=== Chemical contamination ===
In chemistry, the term "contamination" usually describes a single constituent, but in specialized fields the term can also mean chemical mixtures, even up to the level of cellular materials. All chemicals contain some level of impurity. Contamination may be recognized or not and may become an issue if the impure chemical causes additional chemical reactions when mixed with other chemicals or mixtures. Chemical reactions resulting from the presence of an impurity may at times be beneficial, in which case the label "contaminant" may be replaced with "reactant" or "catalyst". (This may be true even in physical chemistry, where, for example, the introduction of an impurity in an intrinsic semiconductor positively increases conductivity.) If the additional reactions are detrimental, other terms are often applied such as "toxin", "poison", or pollutant, depending on the type of molecule involved. Chemical decontamination of substance can be achieved through decomposition, neutralization, and physical processes, though a clear understanding of the underlying chemistry is required.

=== Environmental contamination ===
In environmental chemistry, the term "contamination" is in some cases virtually equivalent to pollution, where the main interest is the harm done on a large scale to humans, organisms, or environments. An environmental contaminant may be chemical in nature, though it may also be a biological (pathogenic bacteria, virus, invasive species) or physical (energy) agent. Environmental monitoring is one mechanism available to scientists to detect contamination activities early before they become too detrimental.

==== Agricultural contamination ====
Another type of environmental contaminant can be found in the form of genetically modified organisms (GMOs), specifically when they come in contact with organic agriculture. This sort of contamination can result in the decertification of a farm. This sort of contamination can at times be difficult to control, necessitating mechanisms for compensating farmers where there has been contamination by GMOs. A Parliamentary Inquiry in Western Australia considered a range of options for compensating farmers whose farms had been contaminated by GMOs but ultimately settled on recommending no action.

=== Food, beverage, and pharmaceutical contamination ===
In food chemistry and medicinal chemistry, the term "contamination" is used to describe harmful intrusions, such as the presence of toxins or pathogens in food or medications. Another important concept is cross-contamination, which refers to the unintentional transfer of contaminants between samples, surfaces, or environments, potentially causing misleading results or safety hazards.

==== Food contaminant detection methods ====
The conventional food contaminant test methods may be limited by complicated/tedious sample preparing procedure, long testing time, sumptuous instrument, and professional operator. However, some rapid, novel, sensitive, and easy to use and affordable methods were developed including:

- Cyanidin quantification by naphthalimide-based azo dye colorimetric probe.
- Lead quantification by modified immunoassay test strip based on a heterogeneously sized gold amplified probe.
- Microbial toxin by HPLC with UV-Vis or fluorescence detection and competitive immunoassays with ELISA configuration.
- Bacterial virulence genes detection reverse-transcription polymerase chain reaction (RT-PCR) and DNA colony hybridization.
- Pesticide detection and quantification by strip-based immunoassay, a test strip based on functionalized AuNPs, and test strip, surface-enhanced raman spectroscopy (SERS).
- Enrofloxacin (chickens antibiotic) quantification by a Ru(phen)3 2+- doped silica fluorescent nanoparticle (NP) based immunochromatographic test strip and a portable fluorescent strip reader.
- Nitrite quantification by The PRhB-based electrochemical sensors and Ion selective electrodes (ISEs).

=== Radioactive contamination ===
In environments where nuclear safety and radiation protection are required, radioactive contamination is a concern. Radioactive substances can appear on surfaces, or within solids, liquids, or gases (including the human body), where their presence is unintended or undesirable, and processes can give rise to their presence in such places. Several examples of radioactive contamination include:

- residual radioactive material remaining at a site after the completion of decommissioning of a site where there was a nuclear reactor, such as a power plant, experimental reactor, isotope reactor, or a nuclear powered ship or submarine
- ingested or absorbed radioactive material that contaminates a biological entity, whether unintentionally or intentionally (such as with radiopharmaceuticals
- escape of elements after nuclear accident, such as the contamination of Iodine-131 and Caesium-137 after the nuclear disaster in Chernobyl, Ukraine.

Note that the term "radioactive contamination" may have a connotation that is not intended. The term refers only to the presence of radioactivity and gives no indication itself of the magnitude of the hazard involved. However, radioactivity can be measured as a quantity in a given location or on a surface, or on a unit area of a surface, such as a square meter or centimeter.

Like environmental monitoring, radiation monitoring can be employed to catch contamination-causing activities before much harm.

=== Interplanetary contamination ===
Interplanetary contamination occurs when a planetary body is biologically contaminated by a space probe or spacecraft, either deliberately or unintentionally. This can work both on arrival to the foreign planetary body and upon return to Earth.

=== Rubbish contamination ===
In jurisdictions where different types of waste are disposed of separately, for example recycling and food waste, contamination occurs when rubbish is put in the incorrect container. Examples include putting plastic bags in food waste bins or plastic wrappings or bags in recycling. When recycling contamination occurs, it can spoil all of the items that have been collected. Recycling contamination is a widespread problem and reduces the value of the items to be recycled, with the costs typically passed to the municipality or authority paying for waste collection.

=== Contaminated evidence ===
In forensic science, evidence can become contaminated. Contamination of fingerprints, hair, skin, or DNA—from first responders or from sources not related to the ongoing investigation, such as family members or friends of the victim who are not suspects—can lead to wrongful convictions, mistrials, or dismissal of evidence.

=== Contaminated samples ===
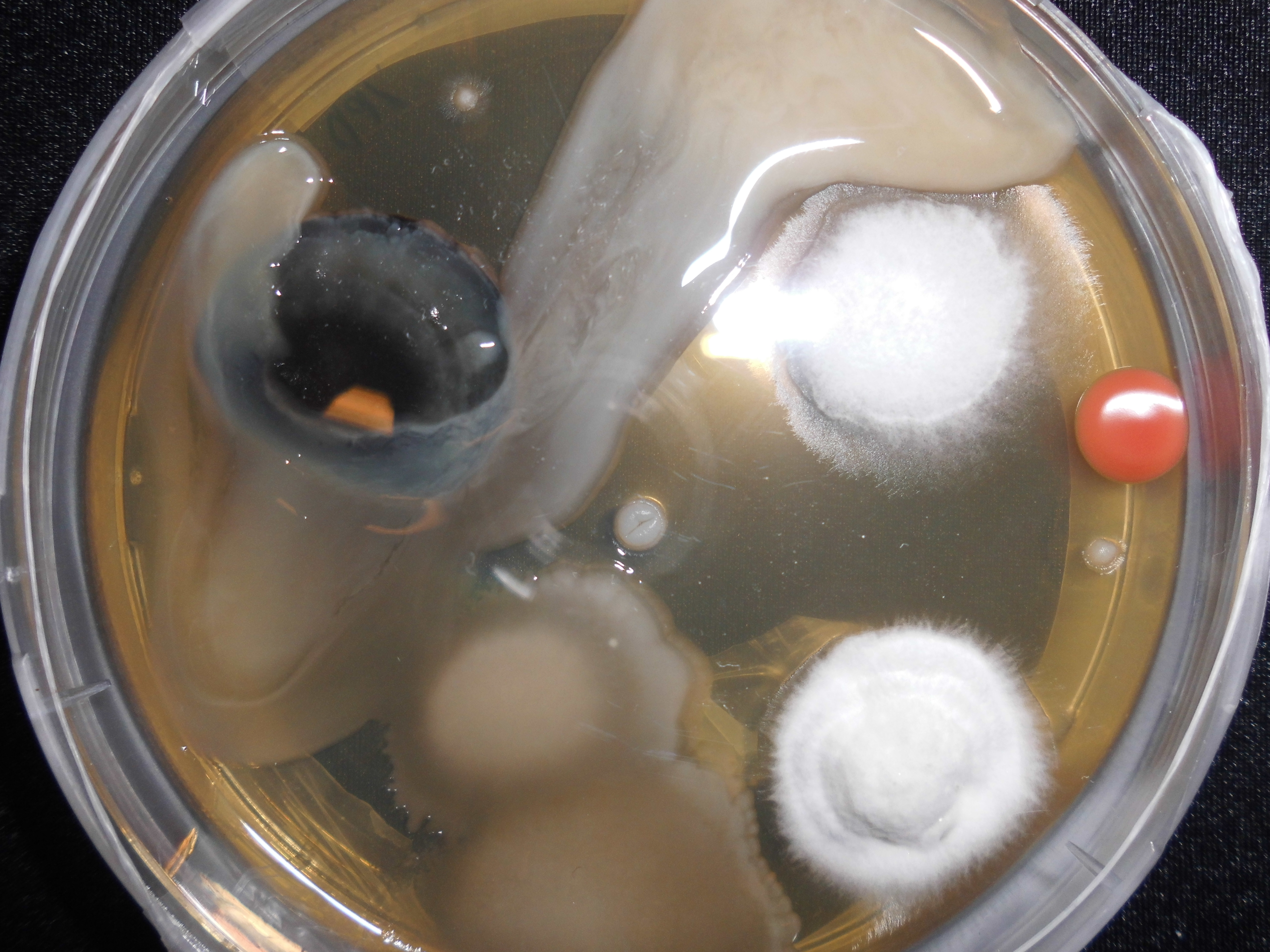
Contamination on agar plate

In the biological sciences, accidental introduction of "foreign" material can seriously distort the results of experiments where small samples are used. In cases where the contaminant is a living microorganism, it can often multiply to dominate the sample and render it useless, as in contaminated cell culture lines. A similar affect can be seen in geology, geochemistry, and archaeology, where even a few grains of a material can distort results of sophisticated experiments.

== See also ==
- Exposome
