= Institut Jules Bordet =

Hospital in Brussels, Belgium

Geography
- Location: Rue Meylemeersch / Mijlenmeersstraat 90, 1070 Anderlecht, Brussels-Capital Region, Belgium
- Coordinates: 50°48′44″N 4°15′43″E

Organisation
- Affiliated university: Université libre de Bruxelles (ULB)

History
- Opened: 1822

Links
- Website: www.bordet.be/en
- Lists: Hospitals in Belgium

The Institut Jules Bordet is a specialised general hospital (with in part university beds) and research institute of the Université libre de Bruxelles (ULB) specialising in oncology. It is located in Brussels, Belgium, and is the only accredited OECI-designated comprehensive cancer centre in Belgium.

Since November 2021, the hospital is located next to the academic Erasmus Hospital in Anderlecht.

== Toponymy ==
The institute is named after Jules Bordet, an immunologist and microbiologist who won the Nobel Prize in Physiology or Medicine in 1919 for his discoveries relating to immunity.

== List of notable people ==
- Dominique Bron, baroness, Head of hematology
- Albert Claude, Director (1949–1970)
- Marc Lacroix (biochemist), Breast cancer researcher
- Martine Piccart, baroness, Head of chemotherapy
- Francoise Meunier, baroness, former IJB staff member and EORTC general director

== See also ==
- List of hospitals in Belgium
- Healthcare in Belgium
