= MGAT4A =

Protein-coding gene in the species Homo sapiens

Identifiers
- Aliases: MGAT4A, GNT-IV, GNT-IVA, GnT-4a, Alpha-1,3-mannosyl-glycoprotein 4-beta-N-acetylglucosaminyltransferase A, mannosyl (alpha-1,3-)-glycoprotein beta-1,4-N-acetylglucosaminyltransferase, isozyme A
- External IDs: OMIM: 604623; MGI: 2662992; GeneCards: MGAT4A
Enzyme activity
EC #	BRENDA	ExPASy	KEGG	MetaCyc
2.4.1.145	↗	↗	↗	↗

Gene location (Human)
Chr.	Chromosome 2 (human)
Band	2q11.2	Start	98,619,106 bp
Band	2q11.2	End	98,731,132 bp

Gene location (Mouse)
Chr.	Chromosome 1 (mouse)
Band	1|1 B	Start	37,478,421 bp
Band	1|1 B	End	37,580,097 bp
RNA expression pattern
Bgee	Human / Mouse (ortholog); Top expressed in: jejunal mucosa; mucosa of colon; renal medulla; mucosa of sigmoid colon; body of pancreas; islet of Langerhans; tibia; visceral pleura; rectum; duodenum / Top expressed in: left colon; submandibular gland; epithelium of small intestine; parotid gland; jejunum; ileum; transitional epithelium of urinary bladder; duodenum; lacrimal gland; seminal vesicula; More reference expression data
BioGPS	n/a
Gene ontology
Molecular function	transferase activity; alpha-1,3-mannosylglycoprotein 4-beta-N-acetylglucosaminyltransferase activity; acetylglucosaminyltransferase activity; hexosyltransferase activity; metal ion binding; glycosyltransferase activity
Cellular component	integral component of membrane; extracellular region; Golgi membrane; Golgi apparatus; extracellular exosome; membrane; endoplasmic reticulum lumen
Biological process	protein glycosylation; N-glycan processing; protein N-linked glycosylation; post-translational protein modification; carbohydrate metabolic process
Sources:Amigo / QuickGO
Orthologs
Databases	NCBI: entry; OMA: entry
Species	Human	Mouse
Entrez	11320	269181
Ensembl	ENSG00000071073	ENSMUSG00000026110
UniProt	Q9UM21	Q812G0
RefSeq (mRNA)	NM_012214; NM_001160154	NM_001290801; NM_173870
RefSeq (protein)	NP_001153626; NP_036346	NP_001277730; NP_776295
Location (UCSC)	Chr 2: 98.62 – 98.73 Mb	Chr 1: 37.48 – 37.58 Mb
PubMed search
- Wikidata
View/Edit Human	View/Edit Mouse

Alpha-1,3-mannosyl-glycoprotein 4-beta-N-acetylglucosaminyltransferase A is a type II membrane protein and an enzyme – particularly a glycosyltransferase – that, in addition to the related isoenzyme B (MGAT4B), takes part in the transfer of N-acetylglucosamine (GlcNAc) to the core mannose residues of N-linked glycans in Golgi apparatus. Therefore, it is essential for the formation of tri- and tetra-antennary sugar chains. Furthermore, it is involved in glucose transport by mediating SLC2A2/GLUT2 glycosylation with controlling cell-surface expression of SLC2A2 in pancreatic beta cells and, as it is suggested, in regulating the availability of serum glycoproteins, oncogenesis, and differentiation.

== Cloning and expression ==
In humans the enzyme is encoded by the MGAT4A gene. The related cDNA was first isolated by Yoshida and others. Equipped with three potential N-glycosylation sites and a length of 535 amino acids the structure of the MGAT4A gene product is similar to other known Golgi glycosyltransferases. The amino acid sequence of humans and of bovines are identical to 95%. Up to now MGAT4A was found in all human tissues and cell lines tested, whether they are normal tissues or cancer cell lines. The expression levels of MGAT4A relative to one another are similar among all tissues, but the expression levels of the correlating mRNA are quite different: Of the normal tissues, spleen, thymus, peripheral blood leukocyte, lymph node, prostate, pancreas, and small intestine showed the highest mRNA level; of the cancer cell lines the promyelocytic leukemia cell line HL-60 and the lymphoblastic leukemia cell line MOLT-4 exhibited the highest expression.

== Animal studies ==
It has been proposed that the MGAT4A isoenzyme acts as a toggle for developing of type 2 diabetes. Mice that lack MGAT4A are hyperglycemic and hypoinsulinemic and have impaired glucose tolerance. Moreover, MGAT4A normally protects mice from developing diabetes but is suppressed by high-fat diet. If this mechanism also operates in human islets, MGAT4A may represent a link between type 2 diabetes and high-fat diet.
