= List of protected heritage sites in Baelen =

This table shows an overview of the protected heritage sites in the Walloon town Baelen. This list is part of Belgium's national heritage.

Object	Year/architect	Town/section	Address	Coordinates	Number^{?}	Image
Church of St. Paul and Roman tower ^{(nl)} ^{(fr)}		Baelen Baelen	rue de l'Eglise	50.631075°N 5.970992°E	63004-CLT-0002-01	Kerk Saint-Paul en de romaanse toren
Organ of the church of Saint-Jean Baptiste ^{(nl)} ^{(fr)}		Baelen	place Thomas Palm, Membach	50.619501°N 5.995462°E	63004-CLT-0004-01	Orgels van de kerk Saint-Jean Baptiste
Castle Vreuschemen ^{(nl)} ^{(fr)}		Baelen	rue Vreuschemen	50.622293°N 5.985957°E	63004-CLT-0005-01	Kasteel van Vreuschemen (gevels en daken) en het ensemble van het gebouw en het omliggende terrein
Hof van Cortenbach (house name) ^{(nl)} ^{(fr)}		Baelen	rue du Pensionnat	50.620709°N 5.998622°E	63004-CLT-0006-01	Straatgevel en zuidgevel van de woning bekend als het "Cour de Cortembach" (Hof van Cortembach) en de stoep voor de gevels en de gevels en daken van de grote ten zuidoosten
Nereth tower ^{(nl)} ^{(fr)}		Baelen		50.641727°N 5.993781°E	63004-CLT-0007-01	Gevels en daken van de toren Nereth
Border marker FI-CI Nord ^{(nl)} ^{(fr)}		Baelen		50.525869°N 6.072879°E	63004-CLT-0008-01	
Border marker FI-CI Sud ^{(nl)} ^{(fr)}		Baelen		50.520979°N 6.072977°E	63004-CLT-0009-01	
Border marker Limbourg-Luxembourg ^{(nl)} ^{(fr)}		Baelen		50.522744°N 6.085483°E	63004-CLT-0010-01	
Border marker B-W-KN ^{(nl)} ^{(fr)}		Baelen		50.521841°N 6.085719°E	63004-CLT-0011-01	
Border marker B-P.157 ^{(nl)} ^{(fr)}		Baelen		50.521793°N 6.086186°E	63004-CLT-0012-01	
Border marker B-P.156 ^{(nl)} ^{(fr)}		Baelen		50.519616°N 6.073005°E	63004-CLT-0013-01	
Various historical objects in Baelen, Waimes & Malméd ^{(nl)} ^{(fr)}		Baelen		50.525604°N 6.044209°E	63004-CLT-0014-01	

== See also ==
- List of protected heritage sites in Liège (province)
- Baelen
