= SK-OV-3 =

SK-OV-3 (also known as SKOV-3; SK.OV.3; SKOV3; Skov3 and SKO3) is an ovarian cancer cell line derived from the ascites of a 64-year-old Caucasian female with an ovarian serous cystadenocarcinoma. The SK-OV-3 cell line is also hypodiploid, with a modal number of chromosomes of 43 (range 42-45), occurring in 63.3% of cells. SK-OV-3 are positive for many of the antigens used to identify cancers of epithelial origin in clinical practice, including vimentin (VIM), high molecular weight cytokeratin (HMWK), low molecular weight cytokeratin (LMWK), epithelial membrane antigen (EMA) and leucocyte common antigen (LCA).

== Use in Research ==
Early work by Fogh, J. in 1986 showed that SK-OV-3 cells do not express the MUC16 (CA125) mucin antigen (that later became the most frequently used biomarker for ovarian cancer detection) and also showed using dose-response curves that SK-OV-3 were platinum sensitive. It was subsequently shown that ectopic expression of the MUC16 C-terminal domain in SK-OV-3 cells decreases their sensitivity to cisplatin-induced apoptosis.

SK-OV-3 have been shown to produce large solid tumours (>1.5 cm^3) when injected into nude mice, with tumours loosely adhering to fat in the pelvic region, intestines and/or omentum.

This cell line is also part of the NCI-60 cancer cell line panel used by the National Cancer Institute.
