= MGAT4B =

Gene in humans

Identifiers
- Aliases: MGAT4B, GNT-IV, GNT-IVB, mannosyl (alpha-1,3-)-glycoprotein beta-1,4-N-acetylglucosaminyltransferase, isozyme B, alpha-1,3-mannosyl-glycoprotein 4-beta-N-acetylglucosaminyltransferase B
- External IDs: OMIM: 604561; MGI: 2143974; GeneCards: MGAT4B
Enzyme activity
EC #	BRENDA	ExPASy	KEGG	MetaCyc
2.4.1.145	↗	↗	↗	↗

Gene location (Human)
Chr.	Chromosome 5 (human)
Band	5q35.3	Start	179,797,597 bp
Band	5q35.3	End	179,806,952 bp

Gene location (Mouse)
Chr.	Chromosome 11 (mouse)
Band	11|11 B1.3	Start	50,101,717 bp
Band	11|11 B1.3	End	50,125,930 bp
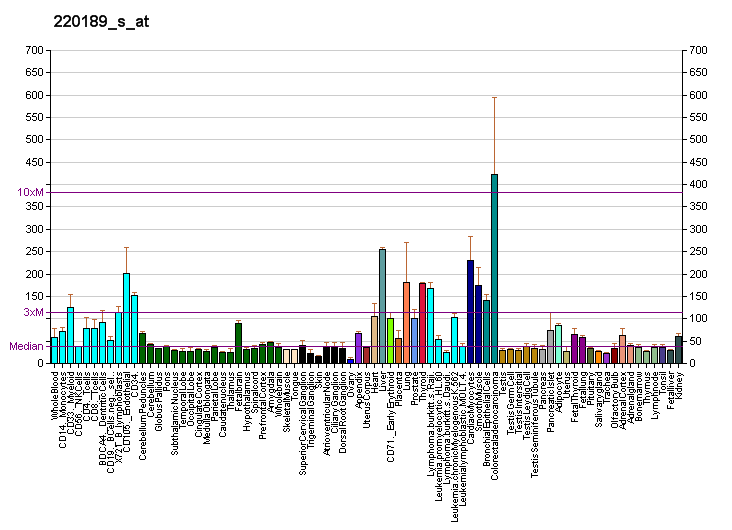
RNA expression pattern
Bgee	Human / Mouse (ortholog); Top expressed in: mucosa of transverse colon; duodenum; stromal cell of endometrium; rectum; right lobe of liver; apex of heart; right hemisphere of cerebellum; left adrenal cortex; islet of Langerhans; right adrenal gland / Top expressed in: crypt of lieberkuhn of small intestine; ankle; stroma of bone marrow; olfactory epithelium; right kidney; gastrula; yolk sac; endothelial cell of lymphatic vessel; left colon; pyloric antrum; More reference expression data
BioGPS	More reference expression data
Gene ontology
Molecular function	transferase activity; alpha-1,3-mannosylglycoprotein 4-beta-N-acetylglucosaminyltransferase activity; acetylglucosaminyltransferase activity; metal ion binding; glycosyltransferase activity; hexosyltransferase activity
Cellular component	integral component of membrane; Golgi membrane; Golgi apparatus; membrane; endoplasmic reticulum; endoplasmic reticulum-Golgi intermediate compartment; Golgi stack
Biological process	protein glycosylation; N-glycan processing; protein N-linked glycosylation; carbohydrate metabolic process
Sources:Amigo / QuickGO
Orthologs
Databases	NCBI: entry; OMA: entry
Species	Human	Mouse
Entrez	11282	103534
Ensembl	ENSG00000284501; ENSG00000161013	ENSMUSG00000036620
UniProt	Q9UQ53	Q812F8
RefSeq (mRNA)	NM_054013; NM_014275	NM_145926
RefSeq (protein)	NP_055090; NP_463459	NP_666038
Location (UCSC)	Chr 5: 179.8 – 179.81 Mb	Chr 11: 50.1 – 50.13 Mb
PubMed search
- Wikidata
View/Edit Human	View/Edit Mouse

Alpha-1,3-mannosyl-glycoprotein 4-beta-N-acetylglucosaminyltransferase B is an enzyme that in humans is encoded by the MGAT4B gene.

This gene encodes a key glycosyltransferase that regulates the formation of tri- and multiantennary branching structures in the Golgi apparatus. The encoded protein, in addition to the related isoenzyme A, catalyzes the transfer of N-acetylglucosamine (GlcNAc) from UDP-GlcNAc in a beta-1,4 linkage to the Man-alpha-1,3-Man-beta-1,4-GlcNAc arm of R-Man-alpha-1,6(GlcNAc-beta-1,2-Man-alpha-1,3)Man-beta-1,4-GlcNAc-beta-1,4-GlcNAc-beta-1-Asn. Therefore, the protein is essential for the production of tri- and tetra-antennary sugar chains. The encoded protein may play a role in regulating the availability of serum glycoproteins, oncogenesis, and differentiation. Its affinities for donors of acceptors are lower than that of MGAT4A so it is suggested that it is not the main contributor in N-glycan biosynthesis.
