= Baelen =

Municipality in Liège Province, Wallonia, Belgium

Baelen Bailou (Walloon)
- Municipality
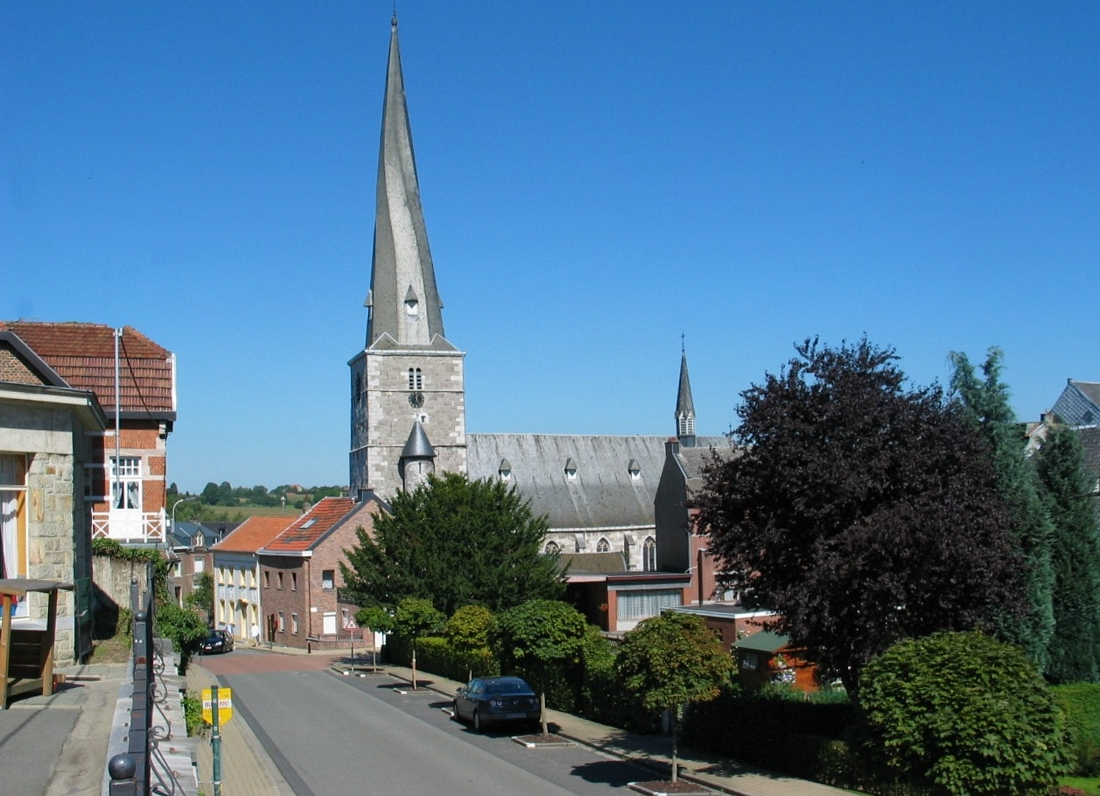

- Flag Coat of arms

- Location of Baelen in the province of Liège
- Interactive map of Baelen
- Location in Belgium
- Coordinates: 50°37′N 05°58′E
- Country: Belgium
- Community: French Community
- Region: Wallonia
- Province: Liège
- Arrondissement: Verviers

Government
  - Mayor: Maurice Fyon (PS)
  - Governing party: Action citoyenne Baelen-Membach (ACBM)

Area
  - Total: 85.65 km^{2} (33.07 sq mi)

Population (2018-01-01)
  - Total: 4,434
  - Density: 51.77/km^{2} (134.1/sq mi)
- Postal codes: 4837
- NIS code: 63004
- Area codes: 087
- Website: www.baelen.be

Baelen (French pronunciation: [balɛn]; Walloon: Bailou) is a municipality of Wallonia located in the province of Liège, Belgium.

On January 1, 2006, Baelen had a total population of 4,060. The total area is 85.73 km^{2} which gives a population density of 47.36 inhabitants per km^{2}.

The municipality consists of the following districts: Baelen and Membach.

== Notable people ==
Born in Baelen:

- Jean Arnolds (1904–1944), priest and member of the Belgian Resistance during World War II

Residing in Baelen:

- Sunday Oliseh, a former Nigerian footballer and coach
- Marc Lacroix, biochemist and breast cancer researcher

== See also ==
- List of protected heritage sites in Baelen
