= Victor-Joseph François =

Belgian physician (1790–1869)

- Born: January 28, 1790; Lille, France
- Died: February 1868
- Occupation: Physician
- Known for: Professor at the Catholic University of Louvain

Victor-Joseph François (January 28, 1790 – February 1868) was a Belgian medical doctor and professor at the Catholic University of Louvain (1834–1968).

== Biography ==
Originally from northern France, Victor François studied medicine at the Faculty of Medicine of Paris, where he worked as an assistant to Thénard and accompanied botanist Antoine-Laurent de Jussieu on herbarium excursions.

In late 1813, a few months after obtaining his medical degree, he began his career as a physician at the military prison in Mons, then part of the French department of Jemmapes, where the wounded from the Napoleonic Wars were brought. The following year, he faced an epidemic of exanthematic typhus.

Naturalized Belgian under the Dutch government, he became secretary and later president of the medical commission of Hainaut. He supported the Belgian Revolution in 1830 and organized the Civil Guard in Mons. In 1832, he dealt with a severe cholera epidemic in the city of Mons. He was one of the founders of one of the oldest Belgian scientific societies, the Society of Sciences, Arts and Letters of Hainaut established in 1833, and in 1841, he was among the founders of the Royal Academy of Medicine of Belgium.

From 1838 until his death in 1868 at the age of 78, he taught at the University of Louvain, where he held the chair of internal pathology and forensic medicine, and served as dean of the Faculty of Medicine.

== Selected publications ==
- Essai sur les gangrènes spontanées, Mons, 1832 (awarded in 1830 by the Royal Society of Medicine of Bordeaux)
- "Note on the immunity of coal miners to pulmonary phthisis," in: Bulletin of the Royal Academy of Medicine of Belgium, vol. XVI, 1st series, p. 555 & seq.
- "Note on the anemia of coal miners," in: Bulletin of the Royal Academy of Medicine of Belgium, vol. IV, 2nd series, no. 6

== Bibliography ==
- "Speech delivered at the funeral of Mr. François, titular member, by Mr. Tallois, secretary". Bulletin of the Royal Academy of Medicine of Belgium: 140–144. 1868.
- "Speech delivered at the promotion hall on February 20, 1868 by N.J. Laforêt, rector of the Catholic University of Louvain, after the service held at the church of Saint Peter for the repose of the soul of Mr. V.J. François, ordinary professor and dean of the Faculty of Medicine". Annuaire of the Catholic University of Louvain: 305–331. 1869.
- "Speech delivered on February 20, 1868, after the funeral of Mr. V.J. François, professor of internal pathology at the Catholic University of Louvain, by Mr. E.M. Van Kempen, dean of the Faculty of Medicine". Annuaire of the Catholic University of Louvain: 332–350. 1869.
