= Membach =

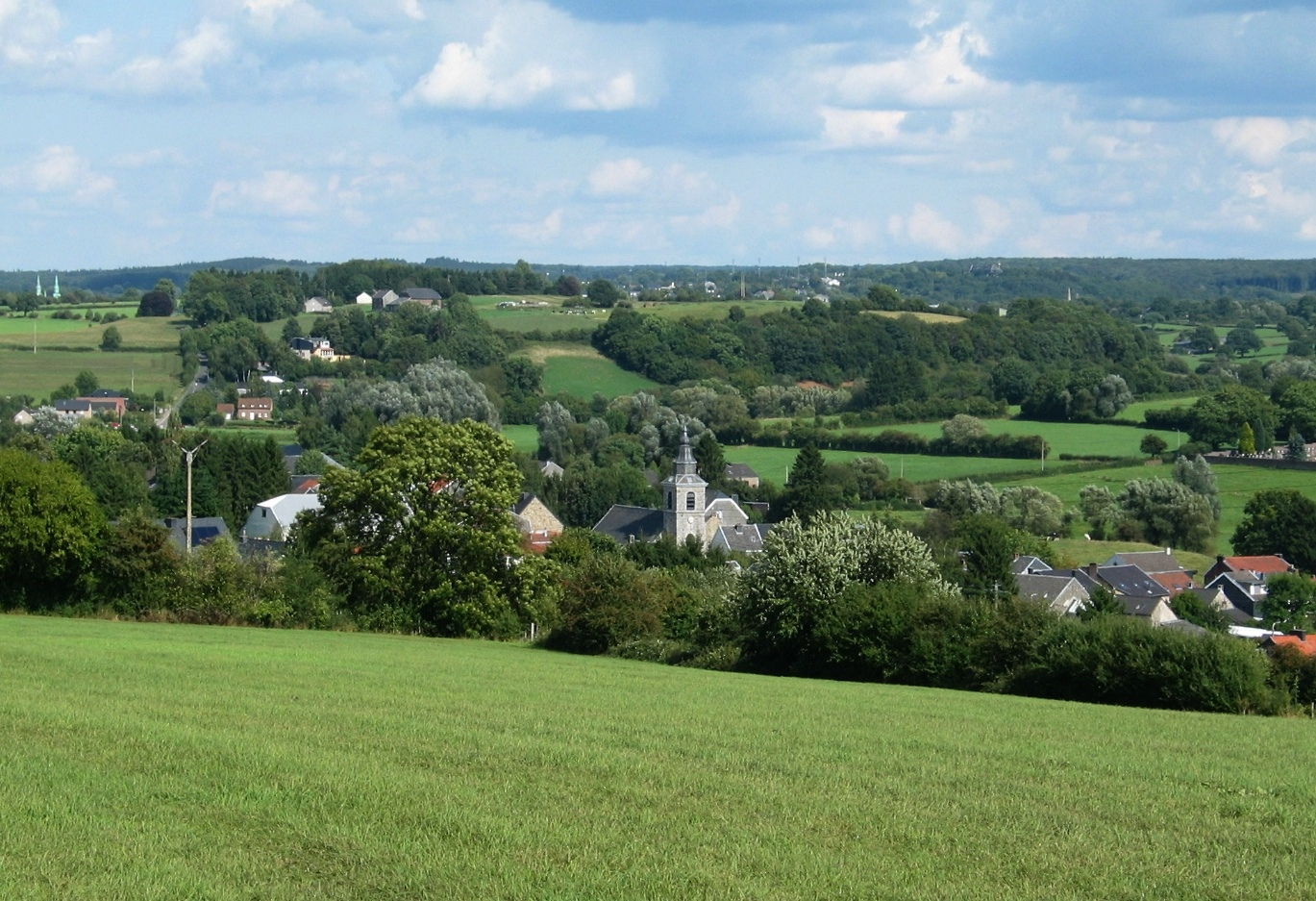
- View over Membach

- Location within Belgium Location within Europe
- Coordinates: 50°37′48″N 05°58′17″E
- Country: Belgium
- Region: Wallonia
- Province: Liège
- Municipality: Baelen

Membach (German pronunciation: [ˈmɛmbax]) is a village and district of the municipality of Baelen, located in the province of Liège in Wallonia, Belgium.

The first time the village is mentioned in written sources is in a document dated 1172. During the 19th century, lead and zinc was extracted here. The village church dates from 1722 but has been altered on several occasions since then. There are several historic buildings in the village.
