= K562 cells =

Human immortalised myelogenous leukemia cell line

K562 cells were the first human immortalised myelogenous leukemia cell line to be established. K562 cells are of the erythroleukemia type, and the cell line is derived from a 53-year-old female chronic myelogenous leukemia patient in blast crisis. The cells are non-adherent and rounded, are positive for the bcr:abl fusion gene, and bear some proteomic resemblance to both undifferentiated granulocytes and erythrocytes.

In culture they exhibit much less clumping than many other suspension lines, presumably due to the downregulation of surface adhesion molecules by bcr:abl. However, another study suggests that bcr:abl over-expression may actually increase cell adherence to cell culture plastic. K562 cells can spontaneously develop characteristics similar to early-stage erythrocytes, granulocytes and monocytes and are easily killed by natural killer cells as they lack the MHC complex required to inhibit NK activity. They also lack any trace of Epstein-Barr virus and other herpesviruses. In addition to the Philadelphia chromosome they also exhibit a second reciprocal translocation between the long arm of chromosome 15 with chromosome 17.

Two sub-lines are available which express MHC class-I A2 and A3.

K562 cells are part of the NCI-60 cancer cell line panel used by the National Cancer Institute.

== K562 cell cycle and regulation ==
Many factors and components play a role in the cell cycle of K562 cells in terms of growth, cell differentiation, and apoptosis. The growth of these leukemic cells are controlled by either initiating cell differentiation or apoptosis to occur.

Cell differentiation is induced by the deacetylase activity in these “undifferentiated progenitor cells,” which alters the phenotype and morphology of the K562 cells. The change in phenotype induces a decrease in the growth rate and leads the K562 cells to the terminal path of becoming mature erythroids, monocytes, and mature macrophages. These changes can also drive the leukemic cells to a state of stress, which allows for increased sensitivity of the cells to drugs that initiate apoptosis.

Pathway of K562 Cell Differentiation

The problem with K562 cells, and many other cancer cell types, is an overabundance of Aurora kinases. These kinases play a role in the formation of spindles, separation of chromosomes, as well as cytokinesis. These functions are necessary in cells in order to divide and regenerate tissues, and play a maintenance role in homeostatic functions. However, the overabundance of Aurora kinases allows for uncontrolled cellular division, resulting in cancer. Inhibiting these is an important regulation mechanism of cancer, because it prevents cells from progressing into mitosis.

Cell Cycle Tailored to K562 Cell Growth and Regulation

Apoptosis is an important mechanism in regulating K562 cells and can be induced by the changes in the metabolic state of the cells. There are many different cellular components involved in the cycle of apoptosis such as BCR/ABL, Bcl-2, Bax protein, and cytochrome C. The tumor suppressor gene p53 is also important in the cell cycle regulation of K562 cells. This gene targets the cyclin-dependent kinase inhibitor, p21, and causes cell differentiation, cell cycle arrest in G1, and ultimately apoptosis. When the levels of these components are thrown off, they can either no longer inhibit apoptosis of the cancer cells, a role fulfilled by BCR/ABL, or they cause apoptosis to be induced, in the same vein as Bax and cytochrome C. These components are key in the mitochondria, and due to this, it has been supported that apoptosis uses the mitochondrial apoptosis pathway. The offset of these cellular components from their balance point causes morphological changes, which result in the K562 cells being arrested in the G2/M phase of the cell cycle. This arrest leads to “shrinkage, blebbing, nuclear fragmentation, chromatin condensing” and other morphological changes that cause the cell to program death at this point.

The ability to induce these changes in K562 cell cycle and cell cycle regulation provides targets for cancer drugs. One of these drugs is Imatinib, which inhibits BCR/ABL causing growth to cease and apoptosis to begin. Another important group of regulators of the K562 line are Sirtuins, referred to as SIRTS. These play a role in cellular stress, metabolism, and autophagy, by interacting with deacetylases activity in the cell. Other methods being focused on in the regulation of K562 cells include therapeutic methods like polyphyllin D, which caused differentiation from the progenitor state to occur, and for apoptosis to begin.
