= Françoise Meunier =

Belgian oncologist

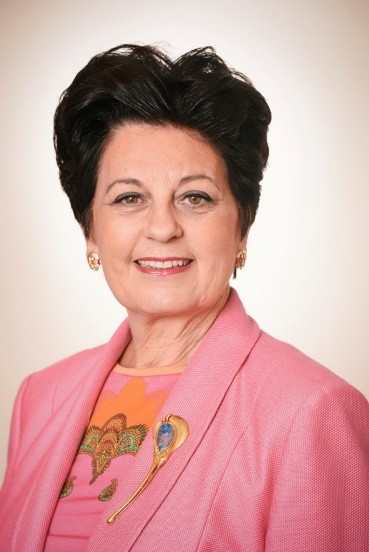
Former EORTC Director General & Founder of European Initiative on Ending Disciminiation Against Cancer Survivors, Françoise Meunier

Françoise Meunier is a Belgian medical doctor specialised in oncology, former Director General of the European Organisation for Research and Treatment of Cancer(EORTC) and Founder of the European Initiative on Ending Discrimination Against Cancer Survivors. She was elevated to Baroness in 2007 by King Albert II of Belgium.

Meunier is the Vice-President of the Royal Academy of Medicine of Belgium (ARMB), a member of the Science Policy Committee of the European Academy of Cancer Sciences (EACS), and a member of the Steering Committee of the Network on Survivorship and Quality of Life at the European Cancer Organisation (ECO). She also serves as a board member of Centre Scientifique de Monaco.

== Biography ==
Françoise Meunier was born October 30, 1949, in Ath, Belgium. She graduated as a medical doctor from the Université libre de Bruxelles (ULB) in 1974 and obtained from the same university a Master of Medical Oncology in 1976. Certified by the Educational Commission for Foreign Medical Graduates (ECFMG) in 1977, she earned a Fulbright Prize the same year and served as a research fellow at the Memorial Sloan-Kettering Cancer Center in New York City (1917 – 1978). Meunier completed a Master in Internal Medicine at ULB in 1979 and earned her PhD in 1985. She later specialised in hospital hygiene, earning a certificate from ULB in 1990.

In 1994, she was named a Fellow of the Royal College of Physicians (FRCP) in the UK and, in 1995, a Fellow (by distinction) of the Faculty of Pharmaceutical Medicine in the UK. As the director General of EORTC from 1995 to 2015, she was involved in the coordination and administration of all EORTC activities. She became a member of the Belgian College of Pharmaceutical Medicine (BCPM) in 2001 and a Specialist in Health Database Management (Belgian Health Ministry) in 2003. In 2006, she was elected at the Royal Academy of Medicine of Belgium (ARMB)

== Advocacy ==
Meunier is a prominent advocate for the quality of life of cancer survivors, specifically around the issue of financial discrimination against cancer survivors under the principle of the "Right to Be Forgotten". Since 2014, she has worked to combat financial discrimination against cancer survivors. She has organised three EORTC Cancer Survivorship Summits (2014, 2016, and 2018) and delivered a TEDx talk in Monaco titled "Cancer Patients Should Not Pay Twice!" in 2016.

Through her leadership in the European initiative on Ending Discrimination Against Cancer Survivors, her efforts include policy advocacy with the European Parliament and key stakeholders to establish a pan-European legal framework for the Right to Be Forgotten. From 2020 to 2022, she led a research project on this issue with the European Cancer Patient Coalition (ECPC). In 2023, she launched a dedicated website as a key resource of information and to promote awareness about existing measures addressing the financial discrimination cancer survivors face, and in 2024, under the auspices of the Belgian Presidency of the Council of the European Union, organised a high-level conference bringing together policymakers, healthcare professionals, and advocates. The event called for an EU-wide “Right to be Forgotten” to end financial discrimination against cancer survivors and reinforced a collective commitment to survivor protection and European solidarity. Stakeholders urged for the harmonisation of legislation and the creation of a support network for implementation.

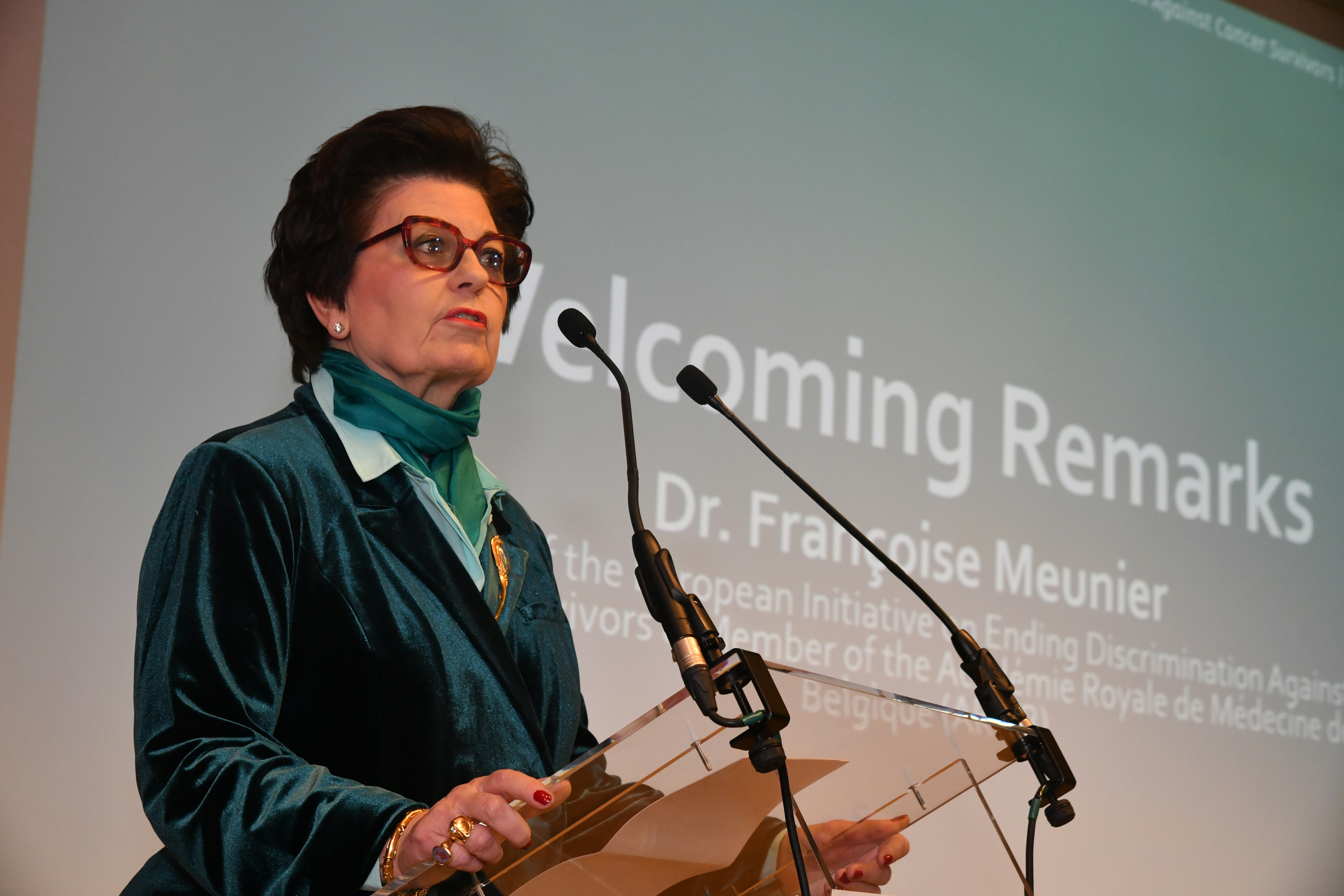
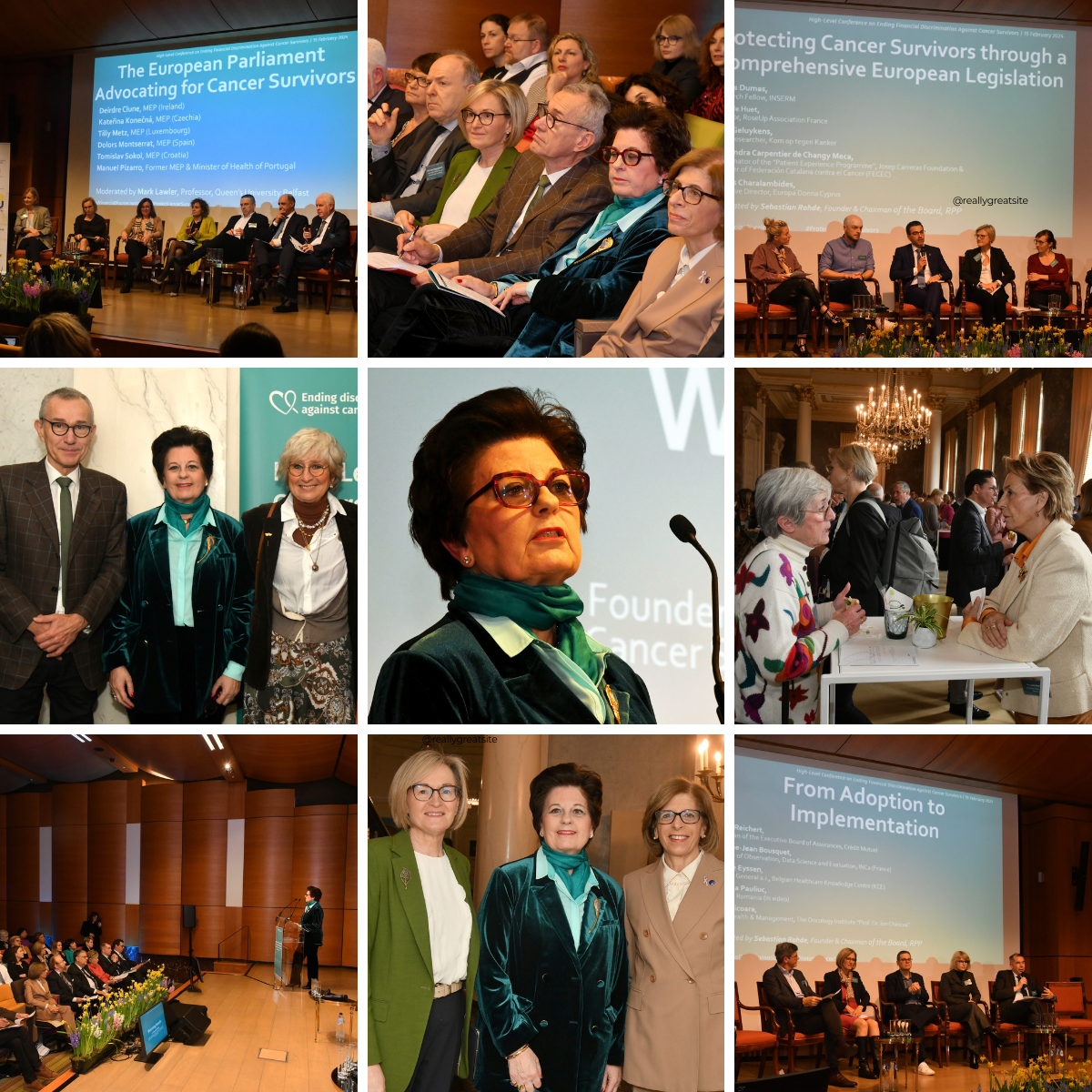
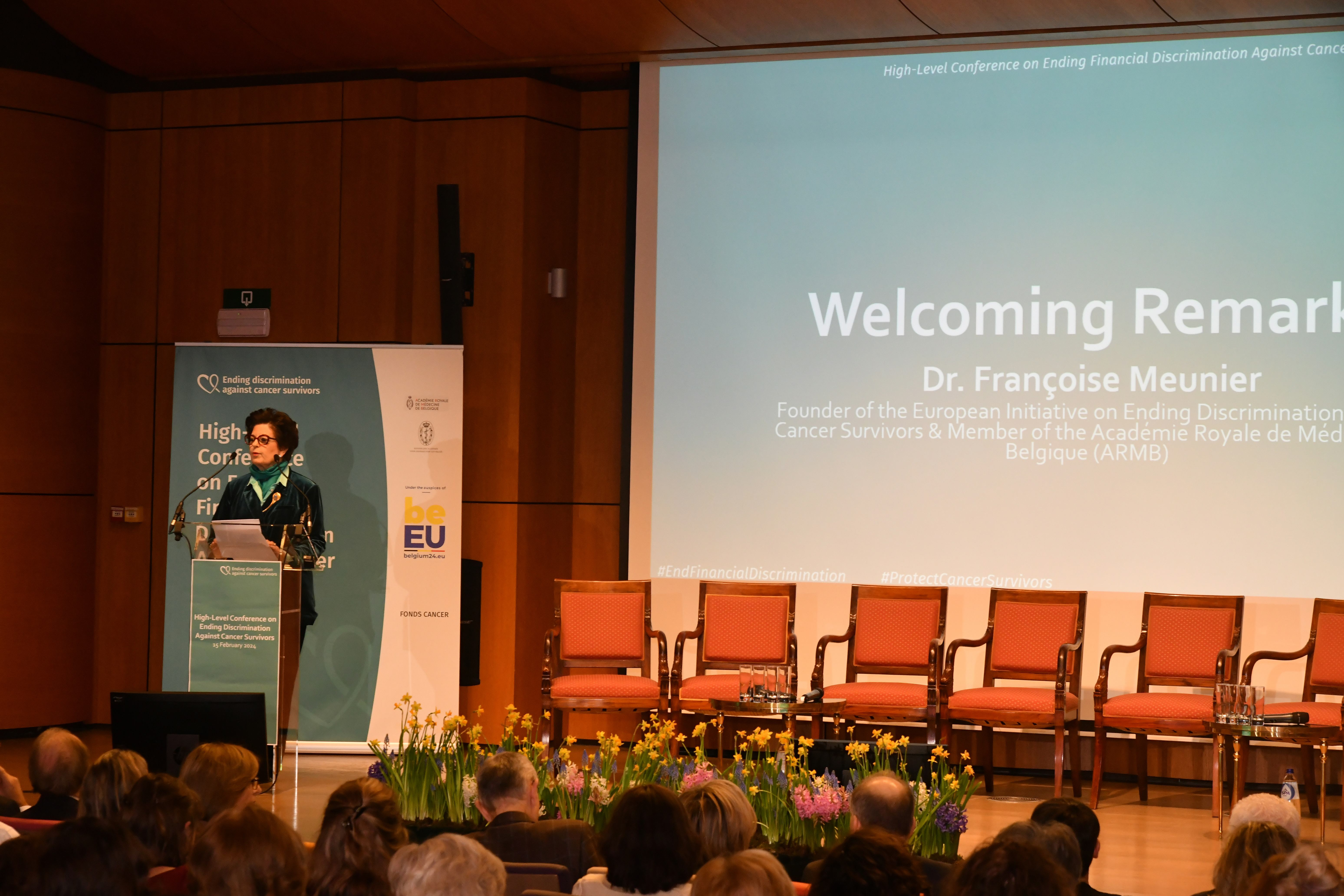

== Awards and honours ==
- 1977 - Fondation Rose et Jean Hoguet] fellowship (for research against cancer)
- 1990 - Fernand Hirsch Prize (AMUB)
- 2004 - Belgian Laureate for the “Prix Femmes d’Europe 2004-2005”
- 2024 - Recipient of the OncoDaily Influential Woman in Oncology award, which honours 100 women worldwide for their leadership, innovation and dedication to advancing oncology.
