= Benoît Lengelé =

Benoît, Knight Lengelé is a Belgian physician, surgeon, and anatomist, born in Brussels.

== Early life ==
Born in Brussels, Benoît Lengelé studied medicine at the University of Louvain (UCLouvain), graduating in 1987. He was interested by face morphology and face modifications caused by aging.

== Work ==
As the Chief Professor of the Chair of Human Anatomy at UCLouvain (Brussels Woluwe campus), he is also head of the department of Experimental Morphology.

Also a plastic surgeon, at UCLouvain's university hospital in Brussels, in 1991 he worked in maxillo-facial surgery at the Central University Hospital in Amiens, where he met Bernard Duchauvelle and Sylvie Testelin. With his colleagues, he developed several new techniques aimed at reconstructing by microsurgery, specific parts of the head and the neck, such as the larynx or the inferior lip. Together they came to the conclusion that results obtained by these autotransplants are imperfect and emit the idea that face allografts could be used to repair patients with severe disfigurations.

On 26 November 2005, Benoît Lengelé performed, with Bernard Dechauvelle and Sylvie Testelin in Amiens, the first partial face allograft to repair the mutilated face of Isabelle Dinoire, a young woman severely bitten by her dog. In 2009, he received honors from his country as a result of his work in allografts, and was knighted by King Albert II of Belgium for his contributions. He also received the title of Knight of the Legion of Honor by the French ambassador of Belgium in 2019.

In addition, Benoît Lengelé is an artist.
