= Martine Piccart =

Belgian physician, oncologist and medical researcher

Martine J. Piccart-Gebhart
- Born: 1953 (age 72–73)
- Education: Université libre de Bruxelles, MD (1978), European medical oncology certification, London (1989), PhD, Université libre de Bruxelles (1993)
- Occupation: Medical oncologist
- Known for: Breast cancer and ovarian cancer research

Martine J. Piccart-Gebhart (born 1953) is a Belgian medical oncologist. She is a professor of oncology at the Université libre de Bruxelles and scientific director at the Jules Bordet Institute in Brussels, Belgium. She is also a member of the Belgian Royal Academy of Medicine.

Prof. Piccart is a past president of the European CanCer Organisation. She has also held presidencies of the European Organisation for Research and Treatment of Cancer and the European Society of Medical Oncology, has served on both the American Society of Clinical Oncology and American Association for Cancer Research boards.

== Biography ==
Martine J. Piccart-Gebhart was born in 1953.

She graduated as a medical doctor from the Université libre de Bruxelles in 1978, where she also met her future husband, Dr. Michael Gebhart. She obtained her internal medicine certification there in 1983. After she graduated she worked as a fellow for two years with Prof. Franco Muggia at New York University Medical Center (1983–85). Returning to Brussels, she worked for Prof. J. Klastersky, head of internal medicine at the Jules Bordet Institute. She became certified in European medical oncology in London in 1989, and earned her PhD from Université libre de Bruxelles in 1993.

She has continued working at the Institute since then and is specialized in breast cancer and ovarian cancer.

A strong advocate for and leader of international research collaborations, Prof. Piccart, together with Prof. Aron Goldhirsch, co-founded in 1996 the Breast International Group to foster collaboration and accelerate the development of better breast cancer treatments. The organisation, which became a legal entity in 1999, is now chaired by Prof. David Cameron and unites 57 academic breast cancer research groups from around the world. About 30 clinical trials and research programmes are run or in development under its umbrella at any one time, and several of its past studies are already considered landmark and practice-changing. Prof. Piccart is currently the Immediate Past Chair, and President of BIG against breast cancer, the unit within Breast International Group dedicated entirely to raising funds to support its research.

An accomplished clinician and scientist, she is author or co-author of over 500 publications in peer-reviewed journals.

== Awards and honours ==
- 1997: European Society of Medical Oncology Award
- 2004: Award from the Breast Cancer Research Foundation
- 2004: Prix Mois du Cancer du Sein
- 2005: Freedom to Discover grant from Bristol-Myers Squibb
- 2005: Jacqueline Seroussi Memorial Foundation for Cancer Research Award
- 2006: Claude Jacquillat Award for achievements in clinical oncology
- 2006: ESMO-GSK Lifetime Achievement Award in Breast Cancer Research (to the BIG)
- 2007: Miami Breast Cancer Conference Award of Excellence
- 2009: Jill Rose Award for distinguished biomedical research
- 2009: William L. McGuire Award
- 2012: Umberto Veronesi Award for the Future Fight Against Cancer
- 2013: David Karnofsky Memorial Award
- 2015: Komen Brinker Award for Scientific Distinction
- 2017: St Gallen International Breast Cancer Award Winner
- 2018: KNAW Bob Pinedo Cancer Care Award
- 2018: Leopold Griffuel Prize
