= Marc Lacroix (biochemist) =

- Born: Marc Guy Albert Marie Lacroix; 28 April 1963 (age 63); Verviers, Belgium
- Education: University of Liège
- Known for: Breast cancer
- Scientific career
- Fields: Biochemistry
- Institutions: Institut Jules Bordet, Belgium

Marc Guy Albert Marie Lacroix (pronounced [maʁk lakʁwa]; born 28 April 1963 in Verviers, Wallonia) is a Belgian biochemist (educated at University of Liège) and a researcher who specializes in breast cancer biology, metastasis and therapy.

He works at Institut Jules Bordet (Brussels, Belgium). He lives in Baelen.

== Earlier work ==
Breast cancer cells (BCC) frequently metastasize to the skeleton, where they lead to tumor-induced osteolysis and subsequent morbidity. Marc Lacroix has investigated the interrelationships between BCC and bone cells (osteoblasts, the bone-building cells, and osteoclasts, the bone-degrading cells). With colleagues, he discovered that BCC produce soluble factors increasing osteoclast activity, notably interleukin-11, the production of which is reduced by the cyclooxygenase inhibitor aspirin. BCC also reduce the proliferation of osteoblasts and their production of collagen, the main protein component of bone. Lacroix also examined the response BCC to the anti-osteolytic agent calcitonin.

In close collaboration with Prof. Guy Leclercq (Laboratoire Jean-Claude Heuson de Cancérologie Mammaire, Institut Jules Bordet, Belgium), Lacroix has studied various aspects of estrogen receptor biology, ligand-binding and transcriptional activity, and life-cycle.

== Recent work ==
The amount of data on breast cancer available for the scientific and medical community is growing rapidly. According to PubMed, a search engine offering access to the MEDLINE database of citations and abstracts of biomedical research articles, 7918 papers containing the expression «breast cancer» were published in 2006. Their number was 3592 in 1996, 1455 in 1986 and only 626 in 1976. In general, the older information is overlaid by more recent data and forgotten to some extent. In 2004, Lacroix and colleagues collected and assembled data from hundreds of articles related to the biology, pathology and genetics of in situ, invasive and metastatic breast cancers. These papers were covering a time period of about 25 years. Lacroix et al. concluded that despite undergoing increasing genetic alteration, most individual breast cancers rather surprisingly maintain their phenotype when they evolve from in situ to the metastatic state. This conclusion was in opposition to a progression model widely accepted at that time, which was suggesting that carcinoma in situ could evolve into invasive carcinoma and subsequently produce metastases through an accumulation of molecular abnormalities possibly allowing extensive phenotype changes and subsequent gain of aggressiveness.

== Bibliography: collaborative books – invited chapters ==
- Leclercq G, Lacroix M, Seo HS, Larsimont D. "Mechanisms regulating oestrogen receptor α expression in breast cancer.", in "Molecular Mechanisms of Action of Steroid Hormone Receptors" 65–75 (2002). Editors: Marija Krstic-Demonacos & Constantinos Demonacos, Research Signpost Publishers, Trivandrum, India, ISBN 81-7736-129-5, https://web.archive.org/web/20070217105555/http://www.ressign.com/
- Lacroix, Marc; Guy Leclercq (2004). "An Updated View on Cell Lines as in Vitro Models for Breast Tumors". In Andrew P. Yao (ed.). Focus on Breast Cancer Research. Commack, N.Y: Nova Science Publishers. pp. 131–182. ISBN 978-1-59033-961-9.
- Sotiriou C, Desmedt C, Durbecq V, Dal Lago L, Lacroix M, Cardoso F, Piccart M. "Genomic and molecular classification of breast cancer.", in "Molecular Oncology of Breast Cancer" 81–95 (2004). Editors: Jeffrey S. Ross and Gabriel N. Hortobagy, Jones and Bartlett Publishers, 40 Tall Pine Drive, Sudbury, MA 01776 USA, ISBN 0-7637-4810-2, http://www.jbpub.com/catalog/0763748102/table_of_contents.htm
- Lacroix, Marc; Guy Leclercq (2006). "Hereditary Breast Cancer: An Update on Genotype and Phenotype". In Andrew P. Yao (ed.). New Breast Cancer Research (Horizons in Cancer Research). Commack, N.Y: Nova Science Publishers. pp. 27–51. ISBN 978-1-59454-932-8.
- Lacroix, Marc (2007). "An Update on Tumor Suppressor Genes in Breast Cancer". In Katherine R. Polinsky (ed.). Tumor Suppressor Genes. Commack, N.Y: Nova Science Publishers. pp. 177–256. ISBN 978-1-60021-693-0.
- Lacroix, Marc (2008). "Disseminated Tumor Cells: Detection, Markers and Prognostic/Predictive Significance". In Akira Watanabe (ed.). Cancer Metastases Research Progress. Commack, N.Y: Nova Science Publishers. pp. 1–45. ISBN 978-1-60456-130-2.
- Lacroix, Marc (2010). "MicroRNAs in Breast Cancer". In Martin E. Romero; Louis M. Dashek (eds.). Breast Cancer: Causes, Diagnosis and Treatment. Commack, N.Y: Nova Science Publishers. pp. 1–53. ISBN 978-1-60876-463-1.
- Lacroix, Marc (2011). "MicroRNAs in Breast Cancer". In Eileen C. Roswell (ed.). Encyclopedia of Breast Cancer Research. Commack, N.Y: Nova Science Publishers. pp. ?. ISBN 978-1-61324-388-6.
- Lacroix, Marc (2012). "MicroRNAs in Breast Cancer". In Gao Shi Tsai; Kong Ai Toh (eds.). Cancer Researcher Biographical Sketches and Research Summaries. Commack, N.Y: Nova Science Publishers. p. 171. ISBN 978-1-61942-066-3.

== Bibliography: books ==
- Lacroix M. Tumor suppressor genes in breast cancer (2008). Nova Science Publishers, Inc, 400 Oser Ave, Ste 1600, Hauppauge, NY 11788-3635 USA, https://www.novapublishers.com/catalog/product_info.php?products_id=6866, ISBN 978-1-60456-326-9
- Lacroix M. Molecular therapy of breast cancer: classicism meets modernity (2009). Nova Science Publishers, Inc, 400 Oser Ave, Ste 1600, Hauppauge, NY 11788-3635 USA, https://www.novapublishers.com/catalog/product_info.php?products_id=10042, ISBN 978-1-60741-593-0
- Lacroix M. MicroRNAs in breast cancer (2010). Nova Science Publishers, Inc, 400 Oser Ave, Ste 1600, Hauppauge, NY 11788-3635 USA, https://www.novapublishers.com/catalog/product_info.php?products_id=12776, ISBN 978-1-61668-438-9
- Lacroix M. A concise history of breast cancer (2011, 2013). Nova Science Publishers, Inc, 400 Oser Ave, Ste 1600, Hauppauge, NY 11788-3635 USA, https://www.novapublishers.com/catalog/product_info.php?cPath=23_132_105&products_id=18309, ISBN 978-1-61122-305-7 (2011), https://www.novapublishers.com/catalog/product_info.php?products_id=40565&osCsid=eab93c77d43f686ab6e8108d41306b3c (2013)
- Lacroix M. Coding for disease: genes and cancer (2013). Nova Science Publishers, Inc, 400 Oser Ave, Ste 1600, Hauppauge, NY 11788-3635 USA, https://www.novapublishers.com/catalog/product_info.php?products_id=41346, ISBN 978-1-62257-817-7
- Lacroix M. Targeted therapies in cancer (2014). Nova Science Publishers, Inc, 400 Oser Ave, Ste 1600, Hauppauge, NY 11788-3635 USA, https://www.novapublishers.com/catalog/product_info.php?products_id=50896, ISBN 978-1-63321-676-1
- Lacroix M. Targeted therapies in cancer: an update (2016). Nova Science Publishers, Inc, 400 Oser Ave, Ste 1600, Hauppauge, NY 11788-3635 USA, https://www.novapublishers.com/catalog/product_info.php?products_id=57553, ISBN 978-1-63484-668-4
