= Walter Nelson-Rees =

American scientist (1929-2009)

- Walter Nelson-Rees in 2005
- Born: January 11, 1929; Havana, Cuba
- Died: January 23, 2009 (aged 80); San Francisco, California
- Citizenship: American
- Known for: Showing that HeLa cells contaminated other cell lines
- Awards: Lifetime Achievement Award Society for In Vitro Biology
- Scientific career
- Fields: Cell culture, cytogenetics
- Institutions: UC Berkeley

Walter Nelson-Rees (January 11, 1929 – January 23, 2009) was a cell culture worker and cytogeneticist who helped expose the problem of cross-contamination of cell lines. He used chromosome banding to show that many immortal cell lines, previously thought to be unique, were actually HeLa cell lines. The HeLa cells had contaminated and overgrown the other cell lines.

== Biography ==
He was born on January 11, 1929 in Havana, Cuba. Nelson-Rees retired in 1980. In 2005 he received the Lifetime Achievement Award, from the Society for In Vitro Biology (SIVB).

He died on January 23, 2009, in San Francisco, California, from complications from a broken hip.
