= NCI-60 =

Cancer cell line panel

The NCI-60 cancer cell line panel is a group of 60 human cancer cell lines used by the National Cancer Institute (NCI) for the screening of compounds to detect potential anticancer activity.

== Purpose ==
The screening procedure is called the NCI-60 Human Tumor Cell Lines Screen, and it is one of the Discovery & Development Services of NCI's Developmental Therapeutics Program (DTP). The screening rates for each cell line the cytostatic and cytotoxic impact of tested substances.

Due to the diversity of the cell lines, it is possible to compare tested compounds by their effect patterns, high correlation potentially corresponding to similar effect mechanisms. An automated comparison against a database of more than 88,000 pure compounds and more than 34,000 crude extracts (as of 6 January 2017) is provided by the COMPARE tool, which shows a list of substances ranked by the Pearson correlation coefficients for a given test substance.

The same panel is used in the Molecular Target Program for the characterization of molecular targets. Measurements include protein levels, RNA measurements, mutation status and enzyme activity levels.

== Cell Lines ==
The panel holds cell lines representing leukemia, melanoma, non-small-cell lung carcinoma, and cancers of the brain, ovary, breast, colon, kidney, and prostate.

13 additional cell lines are evaluated for use in the screening program, among them two lines deriving from so far not represented small-cell lung carcinoma.

All cell lines but one (as of 6 January 2017) are available to other laboratories, including the additional cell lines.

== Misidentification and Misclassification ==
Starting around the turn of the millennium, several cell lines were found to be misidentified or misclassified at the time of investigation or earlier:

MDA-MB-435, originally classified as breast cancer cell line, was identified as being a melanoma cell line. When investigated further, current MDA-MB-435 appeared to be derived from the same individual as cell line M14. An examination of clones made clear that the mixup with M14 happened very early in the history of MDA-MB-435, before establishment in the Developmental Therapeutics Program.

NCI/ADR-RES, originally classified as breast cancer cell line, was identified as being an ovarian tumor cell line. NCI/ADR-RES appears to have been derived at some point in time from cell line OVCAR-8. Originally the cell line was named MCF-7/ADR-RES; it was renamed together with the change in classification.

Two brain cancer cell lines, SNB-19 and U251, were discovered to come from the same person. This makes a mixup likely.

A 61st cell line, MDA-N, has been confirmed to being derived from the misclassified MDA-MB-435 cell line. So it is also misclassified, really being a melanoma cell line, but as of 6 January 2018 the official website still lists it as breast cancer cell line. This cell line is not available as of 6 January 2018.

The International Cell Line Authentication Committee maintains a list of contaminated cell lines. It includes the cell lines reported above, although usually with reporting dates and articles considerably later than the first dates and articles rising specific concern regarding the respective cell line.

=== Continued Use of Wrong Classification ===
As of 2014, hundreds of research studies still use MDA-MB-435 as a model of breast cancer, even after it was officially declared to be a melanoma cell line in 2007, and even in highest-rated international peer-reviewed journals. Similar is true for other misidentified cell lines.

== List of NCI-60 Cell Lines ==
The NCI-60 cell lines used by NCI's Human Tumor Cell Lines Screen as described on the website of the Developmental Therapeutics Program. Links to corresponding Cellosaurus descriptions and Research Resource Identifiers (RRID) have been added. The Cellosaurus identifier is a combination of the cell line name variant chosen by Cellosaurus, with the Cellosaurus accession ID, the latter written as RRID.
Cell line	Tumor classification	(Potentially) misidentified	Original classification	Unavailable	Doubling Time (Hours)	Inoculation Density	Cellosaurus identifier and link
CCRF-CEM	Leukemia				26.7	40000	CCRF-CEM (RRID:CVCL_0207)
HL-60(TB)	Leukemia				28.6	40000	HL-60(TB) (RRID:CVCL_A794)
K-562	Leukemia				19.6	5000	K-562 (RRID:CVCL_0004)
MOLT-4	Leukemia				27.9	30000	MOLT-4 (RRID:CVCL_0013)
RPMI-8226	Leukemia				33.5	20000	RPMI-8226 (RRID:CVCL_0014)
SR-786	Leukemia				28.7	20000	SR (RRID:CVCL_1711)
A549	Non-Small Cell Lung				22.9	7500	A-549 (RRID:CVCL_0023)
EKVX	Non-Small Cell Lung				43.6	20000	EKVX (RRID:CVCL_1195)
HOP-62	Non-Small Cell Lung				39	10000	HOP-62 (RRID:CVCL_1285)
HOP-92	Non-Small Cell Lung				79.5	20000	HOP-92 (RRID:CVCL_1286)
NCI-H226	Non-Small Cell Lung				61	20000	NCI-H226 (RRID:CVCL_1544)
NCI-H23	Non-Small Cell Lung				33.4	20000	NCI-H23 (RRID:CVCL_1547)
NCI-H322M	Non-Small Cell Lung				35.3	20000	NCI-H322M (RRID:CVCL_1557)
NCI-H460	Non-Small Cell Lung				17.8	7500	NCI-H460 (RRID:CVCL_0459)
NCI-H522	Non-Small Cell Lung				38.2	20000	NCI-H522 (RRID:CVCL_1567)
COLO 205	Colon				23.8	15000	COLO 205 (RRID:CVCL_0218)
HCC-2998	Colon				31.5	15000	HCC2998 (RRID:CVCL_1266)
HCT116	Colon				17.4	5000	HCT 116 (RRID:CVCL_0291)
HCT-15	Colon				20.6	10000	HCT 15 (RRID:CVCL_0292)
HT-29	Colon				19.5	5000	HT-29 (RRID:CVCL_0320)
KM12	Colon				23.7	15000	KM12 (RRID:CVCL_1331)
SW-620	Colon				20.4	10000	SW620 (RRID:CVCL_0547)
SF-268	CNS				33.1	15000	SF268 (RRID:CVCL_1689)
SF-295	CNS				29.5	10000	SF295 (RRID:CVCL_1690)
SF-539	CNS				35.4	15000	SF539 (RRID:CVCL_1691)
SNB-19	CNS	yes	CNS		34.6	15000	SNB-19 (RRID:CVCL_0535)
SNB-75	CNS				62.8	20000	SNB-75 (RRID:CVCL_1706)
U251	CNS	yes	CNS		23.8	7500	U-251MG (RRID:CVCL_0021)
LOX IMVI	Melanoma				20.5	7500	LOX-IMVI (RRID:CVCL_1381)
MALME-3M	Melanoma				46.2	20000	Malme-3M (RRID:CVCL_1438)
M14	Melanoma				26.3	15000	M14 (RRID:CVCL_1395)
MDA-MB-435	Melanoma	yes	Breast		25.8	15000	MDA-MB-435 (RRID:CVCL_0417)
SK-MEL-2	Melanoma				45.5	20000	SK-MEL-2 (RRID:CVCL_0069)
SK-MEL-28	Melanoma				35.1	10000	SK-MEL-28 (RRID:CVCL_0526)
SK-MEL-5	Melanoma				25.2	10000	SK-MEL-5 (RRID:CVCL_0527)
UACC-257	Melanoma				38.5	20000	UACC-257 (RRID:CVCL_1779)
UACC-62	Melanoma				31.3	10000	UACC-62 (RRID:CVCL_1780)
IGROV-1	Ovarian				31	10000	IGROV-1 (RRID:CVCL_1304)
OVCAR-3	Ovarian				34.7	10000	OVCAR-3 (RRID:CVCL_0465)
OVCAR-4	Ovarian				41.4	15000	OVCAR-4 (RRID:CVCL_1627)
OVCAR-5	Ovarian				48.8	20000	OVCAR-5 (RRID:CVCL_1628)
OVCAR-8	Ovarian				26.1	10000	OVCAR-8 (RRID:CVCL_1629)
NCI/ADR-RES (originally MCF-7/ADR-RES)	Ovarian	yes	Breast		34	15000	NCI-ADR-RES (RRID:CVCL_1452)
SK-OV-3	Ovarian				48.7	20000	SK-OV-3 (RRID:CVCL_0532)
786-O	Renal				22.4	10000	786-O (RRID:CVCL_1051)
A498	Renal				66.8	25000	A-498 (RRID:CVCL_1056)
ACHN	Renal				27.5	10000	ACHN (RRID:CVCL_1067)
CAKI-1	Renal				39	10000	Caki-1 (RRID:CVCL_0234)
RXF 393	Renal				62.9	15000	RXF 393L (RRID:CVCL_1673)
SN12C	Renal				29.5	15000	SN12C (RRID:CVCL_1705)
TK-10	Renal				51.3	15000	TK-10 (RRID:CVCL_1773)
UO-31	Renal				41.7	15000	UO-31 (RRID:CVCL_1911)
PC-3	Prostate				27.1	7500	PC-3 (RRID:CVCL_0035)
DU-145	Prostate				32.3	10000	DU145 (RRID:CVCL_0105)
MCF7	Breast				25.4	10000	MCF-7 (RRID:CVCL_0031)
MDA-MB-231	Breast				41.9	20000	MDA-MB-231 (RRID:CVCL_0062)
MDA-MB-468	Breast				62	2000	MDA-MB-468 (RRID:CVCL_0419)
HS 578T	Breast				53.8	20000	Hs 578T (RRID:CVCL_0332)
MDA-N	Melanoma	yes	Breast	unavailable	22.5	15000	MDA-N (RRID:CVCL_1910)
BT-549	Breast				53.9	20000	BT-549 (RRID:CVCL_1092)
T-47D	Breast				45.5	20000	T-47D (RRID:CVCL_0553)

== List of Additional Cell Lines ==
Additional cell lines evaluated for use in NCI's Tumor Cell Lines Screen as described on the website of the Developmental Therapeutics Program. Links to corresponding Cellosaurus descriptions and Research Resource Identifiers (RRID) have been added, as well as the species.
Cell line	Tumor classification	Species	Inoculation Density	Cellosaurus identifier and link
LXFL 529	Non-Small Cell Lung	human	10000	LXFL 529L (RRID:CVCL_D085)
DMS 114	Small Cell Lung	human	20000	DMS 114 (RRID:CVCL_1174)
SHP-77	Small Cell Lung	human	40000	SHP-77 (RRID:CVCL_1693)
DLD-1	Colon	human	50000	DLD-1 (RRID:CVCL_0248)
KM20L2	Colon	human	10000	KM20L2 (RRID:CVCL_D889)
SNB-78	CNS	human	20000	SNB-78 (RRID:CVCL_B321)
XF 498	CNS	human	20000	XF 498 (RRID:CVCL_8928)
RPMI-7951	Melanoma	human	20000	RPMI-7951 (RRID:CVCL_1666)
M19-MEL	Melanoma	human	10000	M19-MEL (RRID:CVCL_B415)
RXF-631	Renal	human	10000	RXF 631L (RRID:CVCL_A780)
SN12K1	Renal	human	10000	SN12K1 (RRID:CVCL_D106)
P388	Leukemia	mouse	50000	P388 (RRID:CVCL_7222)
P388/ADR	Leukemia	mouse	50000	P388/ADR (RRID:CVCL_IZ75)
