= HL60 =

Human leukemia cell line

The HL-60 cell line is a human leukemia cell line that has been used for laboratory research on blood cell formation and physiology. HL-60 proliferates continuously in suspension culture in nutrient and antibiotic chemicals. The doubling time is about 36–48 hours. The cell line was derived from a 36-year-old woman who was originally reported to have acute promyelocytic leukemia at the MD Anderson Cancer Center. HL-60 cells predominantly show neutrophilic promyelocytic morphology. Subsequent evaluation, including the karyotype that showed absence of the defining t(15;17) translocation, concluded that HL-60 cells are from a case of AML FAB-M2 (now referred to as AML with maturation (WHO)).

Proliferation of HL-60 cells occurs through the transferrin and insulin receptors, which are expressed on cell surface. The requirement for insulin and transferrin is absolute, as HL-60 proliferation immediately ceases if either of these compounds is removed from the serum-free culture media. With this line, differentiation to mature granulocytes can be induced by compounds such as dimethyl sulfoxide (DMSO), or retinoic acid. Other compounds like 1,25-dihydroxyvitamin D_{3}, 12-O-tetradecanoylphorbol-13-acetate (TPA) and GM-CSF can induce HL-60 to differentiate to monocytic, macrophage-like and eosinophil phenotypes, respectively.

The HL-60 cultured cell line provides a continuous source of human cells for studying the molecular events of myeloid differentiation and the effects of physiologic, pharmacologic, and virologic elements on this process. HL-60 cell model was used to study the effect of DNA topoisomerase (topo) IIα and IIβ on differentiation and apoptosis of cells and is especially useful in dielectrophoresis studies, which require an aqueous environment with suspended and round cells. Furthermore, these cells have been used in order to investigate whether intracellular calcium plays a role in caspase activation induced by reactive oxygen species.

Chromatin and gene expression profiling in HL-60 cells and differentiated cells derived from these has been performed recently.
