= Sodium-coupled monocarboxylate transporter 1 =

Protein-coding gene in the species Homo sapiens

SLC5A8

Identifiers
- Aliases: SLC5A8, AIT, SMCT, SMCT1, solute carrier family 5 member 8
- External IDs: OMIM: 608044; MGI: 2384916; GeneCards: SLC5A8

Gene location (Human)
Chr.	Chromosome 12 (human)
Band	12q23.1-q23.2	Start	101,155,493 bp
Band	12q23.1-q23.2	End	101,210,238 bp

Gene location (Mouse)
Chr.	Chromosome 10 (mouse)
Band	10|10 C1	Start	88,721,854 bp
Band	10|10 C1	End	88,765,377 bp
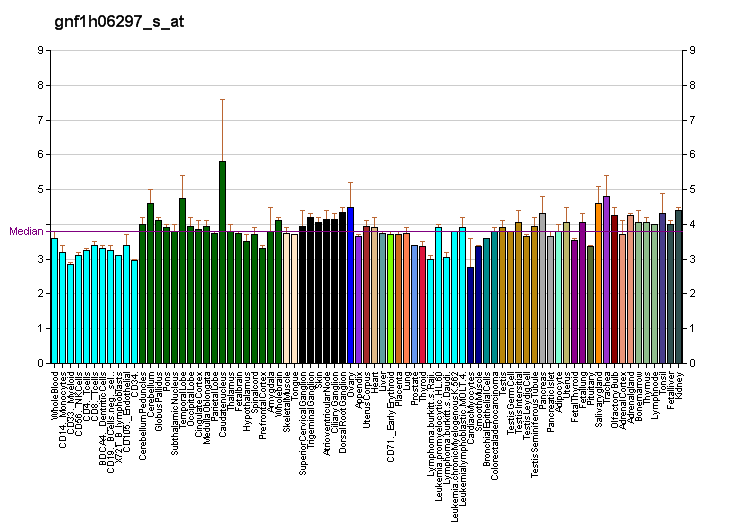

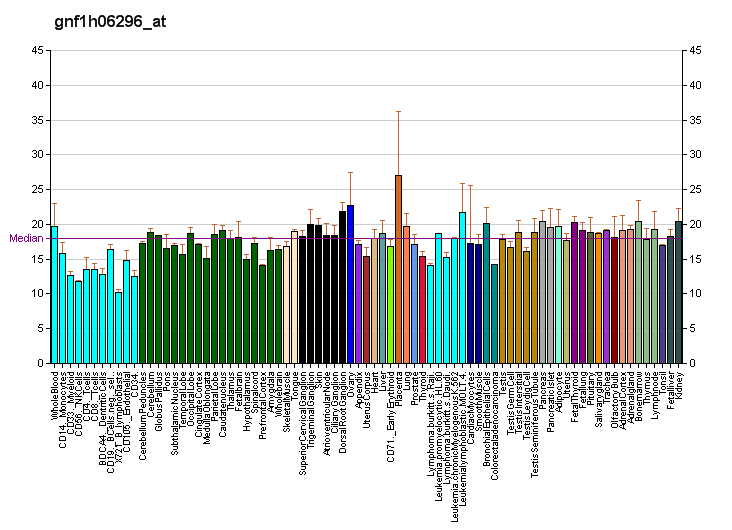

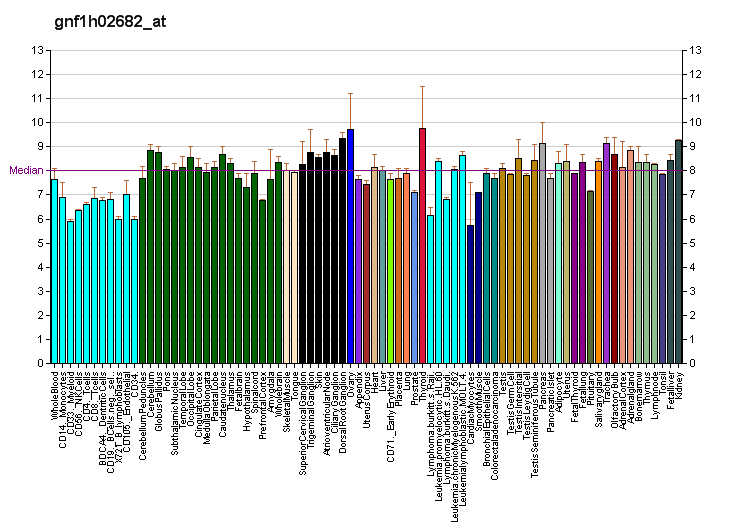
RNA expression pattern
Bgee	Human / Mouse (ortholog); Top expressed in: olfactory zone of nasal mucosa; thyroid gland; left lobe of thyroid gland; right lobe of thyroid gland; testicle; human kidney; right adrenal gland; left adrenal cortex; right adrenal cortex; renal cortex / Top expressed in: left colon; proximal tubule; olfactory epithelium; right kidney; parotid gland; human kidney; lacrimal gland; conjunctival fornix; ileum; intestinal villus; More reference expression data
BioGPS	More reference expression data
Gene ontology
Molecular function	transporter activity; monocarboxylic acid transmembrane transporter activity; passive transmembrane transporter activity; symporter activity; organic acid:sodium symporter activity; lactate transmembrane transporter activity; propionate transmembrane transporter activity; short-chain fatty acid transmembrane transporter activity; transmembrane transporter activity; monocarboxylate:sodium symporter activity
Cellular component	integral component of membrane; plasma membrane; extracellular exosome; apical plasma membrane; membrane
Biological process	ion transport; sodium ion transport; apoptotic process; transmembrane transport; monocarboxylic acid transport; NAD biosynthesis via nicotinamide riboside salvage pathway; transport; propanoate transport; short-chain fatty acid import; lactate transmembrane transport; organic acid transmembrane transport
Sources:Amigo / QuickGO
Orthologs
Databases	NCBI: entry; OMA: entry
Species	Human	Mouse
Entrez	160728	216225
Ensembl	ENSG00000262217; ENSG00000256870	ENSMUSG00000020062
UniProt	Q8N695	Q8BYF6
RefSeq (mRNA)	NM_145913	NM_145423
RefSeq (protein)	NP_666018	NP_663398
Location (UCSC)	Chr 12: 101.16 – 101.21 Mb	Chr 10: 88.72 – 88.77 Mb
PubMed search
- Wikidata
View/Edit Human	View/Edit Mouse

Sodium-coupled monocarboxylate transporter 1 (i.e., SMCT1) and sodium-coupled monocarboxylate transporter 2 (i.e., SMCT2) are plasma membrane transport proteins in the solute carrier family. They transport sodium cations in association with the anionic forms (see conjugated base) of certain short-chain fatty acids (i.e., SC-FAs) through the plasma membrane from the outside to the inside of cells. For example, propionic acid (i.e., CH_{3}CH_{2}CO_{2}H) in its anionic "propionate" form (i.e., CH_{3}CH_{2}CO^{−}_{2}) along with sodium cations (i.e., Na^{+}) are co-transported from the extracellular fluid into a SMCT1-epxressing cell's cytoplasm. Monocarboxylate transporters (MCTs) are also transport proteins in the solute carrier family. They co-transport the anionic forms of various compounds into cells in association with proton cations (i.e. H^{+}). Four of the 14 MCTs, i.e. SLC16A1 (i.e., MCT1), SLC16A7 (i.e., MCT22), SLC16A8 (i.e., MCT3), and SLC16A3 (i.e., MCT4), transport some of the same SC-FAs anions that the SMCTs transport into cells. SC-FAs do diffuse into cells independently of transport proteins but at the levels normally occurring in tissues far greater amounts of the SC-FAs are brought into cells that express a SC-FA transporter.

The human SMCT1 and SMCT2 proteins are commonly referred to by the names of the genes responsible for their production, i.e., SLC5A8 and SLC5A12, respectively. The human gene for SMCT1, i.e., the SLC5A8 gene, is located at position 23.1 on the "q" (i.e., long) arm of chromosome 12 (notated as 12q23); SMCT2's gene, i.e., the SLC5A12 gene, is located at position 14.2 on the "p" (i.e., short) arm of chromosome 11 (notated as chromosome 11p14.2) The SMCT1 and SMCT2 proteins consist of 618(https://www.uniprot.org/uniprotkb/Q8N695/entry) and 618 amino acids, respectively, and have 57% identity at the amino acid level. (The animal proteins are, like the human proteins, here termed SMCT1 and SMCT2 while their genes are termed Slc8a5 and Slc5a12, respectively.) Compared to SMCT1, there have been far fewer reported studies on SMCT2.

SC-FAs come from two sources: the diet and, perhaps more importantly, their release from intestinal bacteria. The intestinal SC-FAs diffuse into the intestine/s wall, enter SMCT1-bearing cells, and diffuse into the blood. These SA-FAs serve as energy sources for cells located in the intestinal wall and throughout the body. The absorbed SC-FAs also stimulate various functions in cells throughout the body that express one of the SC-FA receptors, i.e., free fatty acid receptor 2, free fatty acid receptor 3, or hydroxycarboxylic acid receptor 2. (For the functions elicited by SC-FA's activation of these receptors see free fatty acid receptor 2 functions, free fatty acid receptor 3 functions, and hydroxycarboxylic acid receptor 2 functions.) SMCT1 thereby functions to take up intestinal SC-FAs that have nutritional and wide-ranging stimulating effects. SMCT1 has other functions. SMCT1-expressing cells in the kidney and salivary glands retrieve the SC-FAs in the urine and saliva, respectively, which otherwise would be wastefully discarded. Furthermore, the SC-FAs that enter cells can activate signal transduction pathways which elicit cellular responses independently of the three cited SC-FA receptors. This appears to the mechanism underlying the ability of high SMCT1 levels in kidney cells to ameliorate diabetic kidney disease. It may also underlie the apparent ability of high SMCT1 levels to suppress the development and/or progression of breast, pancreas, lung, brain, thyroid, stomach, prostate, and head & neck cancers. However, these anti-cancerous effects are based primarily on studies finding that, compared to the normal cells in the tissues of these cancers, the cancer cells expressed lower levels of the messenger RNA (i.e., mRNA) that directs formation of the SMCT1 protein. Most of these studies did not measure the levels of SMCT1 protein but rather inferred their levels based on their SMCT1 mRNA levels. Studies have shown that the relation between the level of a mRNA and its protein can vary greatly, i.e., that SMCT1 mRNA levels are not always good indicators of SMCT1 protein levels. This and discrepant findings in studies on colon and pancreas cancers indicate that the role of SMCT1 protein in these cancers requires further investigations.

== Cells and tissues expressing SMCT1 ==
The cells and tissues that express SMCT1 mRNA and/or protein include: enterocytes (i.e., simple columnar epithelial cells) in the ilium and colon of humans, mice, and rats; skeletal muscle of mice; kidney brush border cells in the S2 and S3 sections of the straight proximal tubules and cells in the medulla of mice, rats, rabbits, and humans; cells in the salivary glands of mice; neurons in various areas of mouse and rat brains and the astrocytes in rat brains; and cells in the ganglion cell layer, inner nuclear layer, inner plexiform layer, outer plexiform layer, photoreceptor inner segments, and retinal pigment epithelium in the eyes of mice. As indicated in the cancer studies described below, humans, mice, rats, and/or rabbits express SMCT1 mRNA and/or protein in their normal breast, pancreas, lung, brain, thyroid, stomach, prostate, and certain head & neck tissues.

== Agents transported by or blocking SMCT1 ==
The SC-FAs that SMCT1 transfers into cells include the anionic forms of butyric, proprionic, lactic, acetic, pyruvic acid, and β-hydroxybutyric acids. SMCT1 also transfers the anionic forms of nicotinic acid, the cyclic amino acid pyroglutamic acid, benzoic acid, and pharmacological and therapeutic drugs such as dichloroacetic acid, bromopyruvic acid, Mesalazine (also termed 5-aminosalicylic acid), salicylic acid, and β-hydroxy β-methylbutyric acid. This transfer is an electrogenic cotransporter process in which at least two Na^{+} cations and one carboxylate-containing anionic compound pass into a cell. SMCT2 similarly transfers the cited SC-FAs acids into cells but its affinity for them is less than SMCT1's. Nonsteroidal anti-inflammatory drugs such as ibuprofen, ketoprofen, and fenoprofen bind to but are not transported by SMCT1. However, their binding blocks the binding and thereby transportation of the anionic SC-FAs and, presumably, the other anionic compounds that SMTC1 normally transports into cells. (Hereafter, the acid names of the agents transported by SMCT1 will be used with the understanding that it is their anionic forms which actually enter cells.)

== Functions of SMCT1 ==
=== Gastrointestinal tract ===
Bacteria in the gastrointestinal tract generate and release various SC-FAs, e.g., butyric, propionic, lactic, acetic, and β-hydroxybutyric acids. The SC-FAs released by these bacteria as well as those in the host's diet diffuse into the intestine's wall where they are transported into cells that express SMCT1. The SMCT1-expressing cells are located in the intestinal epithelium from the distal end of the small intestine down to the distal end of the colon. Studies in rodents and humans indicate that the transported SC-FAs: 1) are metabolized for energy by the endothelial cells and stimulate certain white blood cells) in the intestinal walls; 2) diffuse into the portal vein system and enter liver cells which use them for energy or convert them to longer-chain fatty acids for storage; and 3) pass from the liver to the systemic circulation where they serve as energy for and regulate a wide range of functions in cells that express one of the three SC-FA receptors described above.

=== Kidney ===
In one study, SMTC1 mRNA was detected in the kidney cortex's proximal tubules and medulla of mice and in the kidney brush border of rabbits. Vesicles isolated from the kidney's brush borders of rabbits actively incorporated lactic acid and based on indirect studies other SC-FAs, e.g., acetic, propionic, and butyric acids. A second study detected SMTC1 protein as well as mRNA in the kidney cortex, tubules, and medulla of mice. This study also showed that mice lacking SMCT1 due to the knockout of their Slc8a5 gene had massive increases in the levels of lactic acid in their urine. This study indicates that SMCT1 protein is essential for the kidney to absorb lactic acid and presumably other SC-FAs from the urine in mice. The absorption of SC-FAs from the urine is suggested to be an alternative energy source for the kidney cells especially during times of stress. However, the Slc8a5 gene knockout study in mice did not detect any kidney damage.

In further studies, SMTC1 protein was detected in the brush borders of the proximal convoluted tubules in kidney biopsy specimens taken from patients with diabetic kidney disease; the level of SMCT1 protein in the kidney biopsies of these patients was 78.6% lower than that in the biopsies of the normal renal tissues from patients with kidney cancer (this cancer was considered to be incidental to the analysis). The study also found that in a murine model of streptozotocin-induced type 2 diabetes and associated diabetic kidney disease: 1) type 2 diabetic mice (i.e. T2D mice) had lower kidney levels of SMCT1 mRNA than control mice; 2) T2D mice that had the Slc5a8 gene in their renal tubules knocked out and therefore lacking SMCT1 protein developed far more severe kidney disease than T2D mice that did not have this gene knocked out; 3) T2D mice transfected with an adeno-associated viral vector containing the Slc5a gene expressed higher levels of SMCT1 and showed marked improvements in their kidney disease; 4) T2D mice treated with oral 1,3-butanediol (which the liver converts to β-hydroxybutyric acid) showed less damaged kidneys than untreated mice; and 5) a study of 100 patients with diabetes found that the higher their blood serum acetic acid or butyric acid levels were the less likely they were to have diabetes-associated kidney disease. These findings indicate that lower kidney SMTC1 levels are associated with more severely damaged kidneys in mice and humans with T2D diabetes; 1,3-butanediol, which is converted to the SC-FA, β-hydroxybutyric acid, ameliorated diabetes-associated kidney disease in mice; and diabetic humans with higher serum levels of acetic or butyric acid were less likely to have diabetes-associated kidney disease. The study suggested that future studies should be conducted to determine if treating diabetic humans with SC-FAs reduces their chances of developing and/or is an effective treatment for the kidney damage associated with diabetes.

=== Salivary glands ===
A study showed that SMTC1 protein is expressed by cells in the intercalated ducts and acini of the parotid and the acini of the submandibular salivary glands of mice. Compared to normal mice, Slc5a8 gene knockout mice had significantly higher levels of lactic acid in their saliva when evaluated with a pilocarpine-induced salivation test. These findings indicate that the SMCT1 in salivary gland cells mediates the reabsorption of the lactic acid and probably other SC-FAs from the saliva in mice. This relationship appears similar to that found for the kidney's uptake of urinary SC-FAs.

=== Skeletal muscle ===
The function of SMCT1 in the skeletal muscle cells of mice has not been studied but is suggested to have a role in their handling of lactic acid. Resting skeletal muscle cells actively take up lactic acid and use it as an energy source. SMCT1 may contribute to the delivery of this energy source to these cells.

=== Colitis ===
In a murine model of dextran sulfate sodium-induced inflammatory colitis, Slc5a8 gene knockout and control mice were feed a diet that reduced the levels of SC-FAs in their intestines. The Slc5a8 gene knockout mice developed far more severe colitis and higher numbers of potentially premalignant colon polyps than control mice. This difference was less pronounced in mice that were fed a normal diet. These findings indicate that 1) the absorption of intestinal SC-FAs suppresses colon inflammation and polyp formation in this mouse model primarily under conditions of low intestinal levels of SC-FAs; 2) in order to suppress colitis in this mouse model, SMCT1 is required when intestinal levels of SC-FAs are low; and 3) the absorption of SC-FAs when their intestinal levels are normal may involve in addition to SMCT1 other SC-FAs transporters. Several studies have reported that humans with the ulcerative colitis or Crohn's disease forms of colitis have reduced intestinal numbers of SC-FA-producing bacteria and thereby reduced levels of SC-FAs compared to healthy individuals. A recent study reviewed the published controlled trials that used probiotics (which raise the intestinal levels of SC-FAs) to treat ulcerative colitis. The study found with low certainty of evidence that the probiotics increased the rate of clinical remissions and improved patients' clinical symptoms. The magnitudes of these responses were similar to those achieved by a drug commonly used to treat ulcerative colitis, 5‐aminosalicylic acid. The use of this drug in combination with a probiotic appeared to increase remission rates above those achieved with either agent alone. Another study evaluated two control trials conducted on a small number of patients (i.e., 46 adults). It reported that probiotics did not produce higher remission rates in patients with Crohn's disease. However, a panel of experts appointed by the British Dietetic Association analyzed 356 patients randomized to take a probiotic and 311 randomized to take a placebo. The panel concluded that patients with mildly active Krohn's disease who took a probiotic along with their usual anti-colitis medication(s) had an increased rate of remission. The data on which this recommendation was made was graded as of moderate quality. These findings suggest that SMCT1 protein contributes to the suppression of colitis in mice particularly when intestinal levels of SC-FSs are low and may contribute to producing remissions in the two cited forms of human colitis. However, the studies also suggest that, unlike the findings in mice, SMCT1-bearing intestinal cells in humans do not appear able to produce remissions in these diseases when their intestinal levels of the SC-FAs are low.

=== Cancers ===
Colon cancer: In 2003, Li et al reported that SMCT1 mRNA was present in human normal colon tissue but absent in 38 of 64 (59%) human colon cancer tissues as well as in 23 of 31 (74.1%) cultured colon cancer cell lines. (The study did not assay SMCT1 protein levels.) The loss of SMCT1 mRNA expression in human colon cancer tissues and selected cell lines was closely associated with hypermethylation of the CpG sites in exon 1 of the SMCT1 gene; this location contains the putative area that initiates this gene's transcription to form SMCT1 mRNA and protein. (CpG sites are regions of DNA where a cytosine nucleotide (i.e., "C") followed by a guanine nucleotide (i.e., "G") is repeated in a linear sequence of bases along the DNA's 5' → 3' direction.) This hypermethylation was conducted by an enzyme, DNA (cytosine-5)-methyltransferase 1 (i.e., DNM1). DNM1 methylates cytosines to form 5-methylcytosines in CpG sites that regulate the expression of nearby genes. Such hypermethylations, when occurring in tumor suppressor genes, commonly inhibit their expression thereby promoting the cancers that otherwise would be suppressed by these genes. This study suggested that the SLC5A8 gene directs the formation of the SMCT1 protein which acts to inhibit the development of colon cancer and therefore that the SLC5A8 gene is a tumor suppressor gene. In a study of 113 patients diagnosed with Dukes classification stage C (i.e., locally advanced lymph node-positive but no distant metastases) colon cancer, survival times were significantly longer in patients with tumors that expressed higher levels of SMCT protein (presumed to be SMCT1 protein). The study concluded that the SMCT1 protein suppresses the development of colon cancer in humans and slows the progression of human colon cancers that had not spread to distant tissues. However, another study reported that: 1) Slc5a8 gene knockout mice did not develop colon cancer during a 20 month observation period and 2) there were no differences in the number of tumors formed between Slc5a8 gene knockout and control mice in three models of colon cancer formation, i.e., mice treated with a colon cancer-causing agent, either azoxymethane or dextran sulfate, or mice genetically predisposed to develop cancer due to a mutation in their Adenomatous polyposis coli gene, i.e., Apc^{mim} mice. Thus, the complete absence of SMCT1 protein did not increase the susceptibility of mice to colon cancers that developed "spontaneously" or in three models of colon cancer and thereby question the Slc5a8 gene's role in the development of colon cancer in mice. The study did allow that the mice in these cancer models may have had other SC-FA transporters besides SMCT1 that suppressed the development of the colon cancers. Further studies are needed to resolve these issues.

Breast cancer: The levels of SMCT1 mRNA were reduced in 27 of 30 human breast cancer tumors compared to their levels in adjacent normal breast tissues. This reduction occurred in estrogen receptor positive, estrogen receptor negative, and triple negative breast cancers. Similarly, cultured MCF7, T47D, and ZR75.1 human breast cancer cells expressed far lower levels of SMCT1 mRNA than human non-cancerous cultured breast epithelium HMEC cells, breast epithelium HBL100 cells, and (male) foreskin MCF10A cells. When MCF7 cells were forced to express SMCT1 by being transfected with cDNA encoding SMCT1, they developed apoptosis (i.e., they died by engaging a cell death program); this development depended on these cells' uptake of extracellular SC-FAs, i.e., pyruvate or propionate. (SMCT1 protein was not measured in this study.) The study concluded that SMCT1 protein acts to suppress the cited types of human breast cancers. A study of human breast MCF10A cells and the oncogenic cell lines derived from this cell line, i.e., non-cancerous normal MCF10A1, premalignant MCF10AT1k.cl2, ductal carcinoma in situ MCF10CA1h, and invasive MCF10CA1a.cl1 breast cancer cells concluded that inactivation of the SLC5A8 gene was an early and necessary event in the progression of the non-cancerous cells to invasive cancer cells. The study supported the suggestion that the SLC585 gene is a tumor suppressor gene.

Cervical cancer: A study of 58 patients with cancer of the cervix found that the average level of SMCT1 mRNA was significantly lower in their cancerous than adjacent, noncancerous cervical tissue. SMCT1 mRNA levels were also lower in three human cervical cancer cell lines (i.e., HeLa, abd, and CaSki cells) and a human uterus cancer cell line (i.e., SiHa cells) than normal human cervical epithelial cells. The proliferation of cultured SiHa cells transfected with a SLC5A8 gene-expressing plasmid was significantly lower than that of SiHA cells transfected with a negative control plasmid. The lower proliferation rate of SiHa cells transfected with the SCL5A8 gene-expressing plasmid was associated with the development of apoptosis in the cancer cells. (SMCT1 protein was not measured in this study.) The study concluded that the SMCT1 protein acts to suppress human cervical cancer at least in part by increasing their cancer cells' rate of apoptosis.

Pancreatic cancer: The pancreatic cancers of 10 humans expressed low levels or did not express SMCT1 mRNA whereas 11 of 28 adjacent non-cancerous pancreas tissues from these humans expressed relatively high levels of SMCT1 mRNA. The human pancreatic cancer cell lines PANC-1, MIA PaCa-2, and Capan2 did not express SMCT1 mRNA and evidenced high hypermethylation levels in the CpG sites of their SLC5A8 gene similar to that in colon cancer. Treatment of these three cell lines with an inhibitor of CpG site methylation, 5-aza-2′-deoxycytidine (also termed decitabine), increased their levels of SMCT1 mRNA. (This study did not measure SMCT1 protein.) The study concluded that SMCT1 protein acts to suppress the development and/or progression of human pancreatic cancers.

Lung cancer: SMCT1 mRNA levels were reduced or absent in 9 of 23 (39.1%) human lung cancer tissues compared to their adjacent normal lung tissues. This difference was associated with increased levels of hypermethylation in the CpG sites of the lung cancer tissues similar to that seen in colon cancer. SMCT1 mRNA was also not expressed in 21 of 22 lung cancer cell lines. Analysis of cells in the human A549 cell lung cancer cell line showed that they too had increased levels of hypermethylation in the CpG sites similar to that seen in colon cancer. This cell line was the only one tested for this relationship. (SMCT1 protein levels were not assayed in these studies). Another study found that patients with adenocarcinomas of the lung stages I or II (i.e., cancers localized to a small or larger, respectively, part of the lung) who exhibited high methylation levels in the CpG sites of their SLC5A8 gene had shorter disease-free survival times than patients who did not have this methylation pattern. (The study did not measure SMCT1 mRNA or protein levels.) The two studies respectively concluded that SMCT1 protein inhibits the development and/or progression of the cited human lung cancers and prolongs the survival of individuals with earlier stages lung adenocarcinomas.

Brain cancer: The following findings were reported in a study of brain cancers. 1) SMCT1 mRNA levels were significantly lower in 13 human gliomas than their levels in normal human brain tissues. 2) The human glioma LN229 and LN443 cell lines expressed little or no SMCT1 mRNA, had CpG site hypermethylations similar to that in colon cancer, increased their expression of SMCT1 mRNA when treated with the inhibitor of CpG site methylation, 5-aza-2′-deoxycytidine, and after transfection with a SLC5A8 gene-containing retrovirus vector formed far fewer colonies than LN229 and LN443 cells transfected with an empty viral vector as judged in a laboratory assay that measured the ability of single cells to grow into colonies. And 3) 17 Human grade II astrocytomas, 10 grade II oligodendrogliomas, and 13 grade III oligodendrogliomas as well as 9 of 10 mouse oligodendrogliomas had CpG site hypermethylations similar to that seen in colon cancer. Cancers graded as 1, II, III, and 1V are respectively well-differentiated-low grade, moderately differentiated-intermediate grade, poorly differentiated-high grade, and undifferentiated-high grade cancers. (SMCT1 protein was not assayed in these studies.) The study concluded that SMCT1 protein acts to inhibit the development and/or progression of the cited human brain cancers and may do so at least in part by inhibiting the proliferation of their cancer cells.

Thyroid cancer: SMCT1 mRNA levels in the cancerous tissues of 18 patients with the classical form of papillary thyroid carcinoma were 40-fold lower than in their thyroid glands normal tissues. (The classical form of papillary thyroid carcinoma contains true papillae, i.e., papillae with a central vascular core and epithelial cells that have an enlarged nuclei with nuclear membrane irregularities and a distinct chromatin pattern.) In 90% of these classical carcinomas, CpG site hypermethylations in these cancer cells were similar to that in colon cancer. (The study did not measure SMCT1 protein levels.) In another study of patients with thyroid disease, SMCT1 mRNA levels in papillary thyroid carcinoma tissues were significantly lower than those in non-cancerous multinodular goiter thyroid tissues. The SLC5A8 gene in papillary thyroid cancer tissues but not in the multinodular goiter tissues had hypermethylations in CpG sites similar to that in colon cancer. (This study did not measure SMCT1 protein.) The two studies concluded that SMCT1 protein acts to inhibit the development and/or progression of human papillary thyroid carcinomas.

Head & neck cancers: SMCT1 mRNA levels were decreased in 10 of 13 (77%) head & neck squamous cell carcinomas compared to the levels in the corresponding non-cancerous head & neck tissues (i.e., tongue, tonsil, pharynx, larynx, and other sites in the oral cavity). This relationship was associated with increased CpG site hypermethylations in the cancer tissues similar to that in colon cancer. Treatment of 5 head & neck squamous carcinoma cell lines (SCC8, SCC11B, SCC17AS, SCC22B, and SCC25) with the CpG site-demethylating agent, 5-aza-2′-deoxycytidine, increased the levels of SMCT1 mRNA in all but the SCC11B cell line. And, SCCB22 cells, which express low levels of SMCT1 mRNA, formed far more colonies in a colony forming assay than SCCBB2 cells that were made to overexpress SMCT1 by being transfected with SLC5A8 gene-expressing pBAB-pro (plasmid #1764) viral vector. (This study did not measure SMCT1 protein levels). The study concluded that SMCT1 protein acts to suppress the development and/or progression of these carcinomas and appears to do so at least in part by suppressing their ability to form colonies.

Gastric cancer: Ten human gastric cancer cell lines MKN7, MKN1, JRST, SNU1, KatoIII, NUGC4, SNU638, SH101, HSC44, and HSC45 cells and two mouse gastric cancer cell lines, MKN28 and MKN74 were examined for hypermethylations of the CpG sites similar to that seen in colon cancer. All of these cell lines except MKN1 human and MKN74 mouse gastric cancer cells showed this hypermethylation pattern. Among 7 cell lines tested, i.e., HSC44, HSC45, MKN28, MKN74, NUGC4, Kato III, and SNU638, only MKN74 cells had detectable levels of mRNA for SMCT1. (The study did not measure SMCT1 protein.) Studies in mice and human gastric cancer tissues are needed to relate these findings to gastric cancer.

Prostate cancer: One study reported that the levels of SMCT1 mRNA were undetectable or reduced in 7 of 10 human prostate cancers compared to their normal prostate tissues. The undetectable or reduced levels of SMCT1 were associated with hypermethylations of CpG sites similar to that in colon cancer. Furthermore, SMCT1 mRNA was not expressed in PC-3 and DU-145 human prostate cancer cell lines and treatment of these cells with the CpG site demethylating agent, 5-aza-2′-deoxycytidine, increased the levels of SMCT1 mRNA in both cell lines. (This study did not measure SMCT1 protein levels.) The study concluded that SMCT1 protein acted to suppress the development and/or progression of human prostate cancers. In contrast to these findings, a later study of sugicial specimens from human prostate glands reported that: 1) SMCT1 protein levels in the prostate cancers of 19 patients were 84% higher than their levels in adjacent benign prostate hyperplasia (i.e. BPH) tissues; 2) SMCT1 protein levels in 24 prostate cancer tissues were 50% higher, 42% similar to, and only 8% lower than their adjacent prostate intraepithelial neoplasia (i.e. PIN) tissues; 3) SMCT1 protein levels in 140 prostate gland cancer tissues were significantly higher than in 24 prostate gland BPH tissues snf 32 prostate gland PIN tissues; 4) the levels of SMCT1 mRNA were lower in surgical specimens of 6 among 10 prostate cancer tissues than in the adjacent non-neoplastic tissues; and 5) the SMCT1 proteins were located predominantly in the cytoplasm of prostate cancer tissues. This study contrasted with the previous study in finding that prostate cancers commonly expressed high levels of SMCT1 protein and that the levels of SMCT1 protein trended opposite to its mRNA levels in the prostate cancer tissues from a small number of patients. The study also reported that SMCT1 protein was located principally in the cytoplasm of prostate cancer tissues and suggested that cytoplasmic SMCT1 protein would seem to be inactive in transporting SC-FAs into cells. These contrasting findings suggest that further studies are needed to measure SMCT1 protein along with SMCT1 mRNA levels and to identify the subcellular location (e.g., surface membrane versus cytoplasm) of SMCT1 proteins in normal, BPH, PIN, and cancer prostate tissue and perhaps also in the normal and cancerous tissues of the other cancers cited here.

== See also ==
Sodium-coupled monocarboxylate transporter 2
