= Sodium-coupled monocarboxylate transporter 2 =

Cell membrane transport protein

SLC5A12

Identifiers
- Aliases: SLC5A12, SMCT2, solute carrier family 5 member 12, Sodium-coupled monocarboxylate transporter 2
- External IDs: OMIM: 612455; MGI: 2138890; GeneCards: SLC5A12

Gene location (Human)
Chr.	Chromosome 11 (human)
Band	11p14.2	Start	26,667,020 bp
Band	11p14.2	End	26,723,427 bp

Gene location (Mouse)
Chr.	Chromosome 2 (mouse)
Band	2|2 E3	Start	110,427,643 bp
Band	2|2 E3	End	110,478,124 bp
RNA expression pattern
Bgee	Human / Mouse (ortholog); Top expressed in: kidney tubule; jejunal mucosa; corpus epididymis; human kidney; buccal mucosa cell; glomerulus; metanephric glomerulus; testicle; renal medulla; right auricle of heart / Top expressed in: human kidney; right kidney; jejunum; secondary oocyte; zygote; primary oocyte; embryo; renal cortex; embryo; primary visual cortex; More reference expression data
BioGPS	n/a
Gene ontology
Molecular function	transporter activity; organic acid:sodium symporter activity; lactate transmembrane transporter activity; symporter activity; transmembrane transporter activity
Cellular component	integral component of membrane; extracellular exosome; apical plasma membrane; membrane; plasma membrane
Biological process	lactate transmembrane transport; transmembrane transport; sodium ion transport; ion transport; organic acid transmembrane transport; transport
Sources:Amigo / QuickGO
Orthologs
Databases	NCBI: entry; OMA: entry
Species	Human	Mouse
Entrez	159963	241612
Ensembl	ENSG00000148942	ENSMUSG00000041644
UniProt	Q1EHB4	Q49B93
RefSeq (mRNA)	NM_178498	NM_001003915; NM_001177624
RefSeq (protein)	NP_848593	NP_001003915; NP_001171095
Location (UCSC)	Chr 11: 26.67 – 26.72 Mb	Chr 2: 110.43 – 110.48 Mb
PubMed search
- Wikidata
View/Edit Human	View/Edit Mouse

Sodium-coupled monocarboxylate transporter 2 (i.e., SMCT2, also termed SLC5A12) is a plasma membrane transport protein in the solute carrier family. It transports sodium cations (i.e., Na^{+}) in association with the anionic forms (see conjugated base) of certain short-chain fatty acids (i.e., SC-FAs) and other agents through the plasma membrane from the outside to the inside of cells. The only other member of the sodium-coupled monocarboxylate transporter group (sometimes referred to as the SLC5A family), SMCT1, similarly co-transports SC-FAs and other agents into cells. Monocarboxylate transporters (MCTs) are also transport proteins in the solute carrier family. They co-transport the anionic forms of various compounds into cells in association with hydrogen cations (i.e. H^{+}). Four of the 14 MCTs, i.e. SLC16A1 (i.e., MCT1), SLC16A7 (i.e., MCT22), SLC16A8 (i.e., MCT3), and SLC16A3 (i.e., MCT4), transport some of the same SC-FAs anions that the two SMCTs transport into cells. SC-FAs do diffuse into cells independently of transport proteins but at the levels normally occurring in tissues greater amounts of the SC-FAs are brought into cells that express a SC-FA transporter.

The human gene responsible for producing SMCT2 protein, i.e., the SLC5A12 gene, is located at position 14.2 on the "p" (i.e., short) arm of chromosome 11 (position notated as chromosome 11p14.2). The full length SMCT2 protein product of this gene consist of 618 amino acids and has a 57% identity with the SMCT1 protein at the amino acid level. The gene for SMCT2 in mice and rats is termed the Slc5a12 gene.

Studies indicate that the SMCT2 on intestinal epithelial cells promotes their uptake of intra-intestinal SC-FAs and subsequent diffusion of the SC-FAs into the systemic circulation. These SC-FAs serve as energy sources for and activators of diverse responses in a wide range of cell types in the intestinal wall and throughout the entire body. Studies also suggest that: 1) SMCT2 in the kidney tubule cells contributes to the reabsorption of urinary SC-FAs that would otherwise be wasted in the urine; 2) the SMCT2 on the Müller cells in the eye promotes their uptake SC-FAs which they pass on to retinal neurons that use them as energy sources; and 3) the SCMT2 on skeletal muscle cells may contribute to regulating their lactic acid levels.

== Tissues and cells expressing SMCT2 ==
The SMCT2 protein and/or its messenger RNA is expressed by the human and/or murine: epithelial cells in the proximal (i.e., initial and middle portions) of the small intestine; epithelial cells in the renal tubules of the kidney; Müeller cells in the retina, and skeletal muscles throughout the body.

== Agents transmitted by or blocking SMCT2 ==
The SC-FAs transported into cells by SMCT2 include butyric, proprionic, pyruvic, lactic, acetic, and β-hydroxybutyric acids. SMCT2 also transports into cells the anionic forms of nicotinic acid and gamma-hydroxybutyric acid. Nonsteroidal anti-inflammatory drugs such as ibuprofen, ketoprofen, and fenoprofen bind to but are not transported by SMCT2. However, their binding blocks the binding and thereby transportation of the anionic SC-FAs and, presumably, the other anionic compounds that SMTC2 normally transports into cells. SMCT1 likewise transports these SC-FAs and nicotinic acid and is blocked by the cited anti-inflammatory drugs. SMCT2 does have much lower affinities than SMCT1 for binding the SC-FAs and therefore is better suited to transport larger amounts of SC-FAs when their concentrations are high.

== Functions of SMCT2 ==
=== Gastrointestinal tract ===
SC-FAs inside the gastrointestinal tract come from the ingested food or are released by intestinal bacteria as fermentation products of the ingested food. SMCT2-bearing cells are located in the epithelial cells of the proximal portion (primarily the jejunum) of the small intestine but are not in the large intestine or cecum. Cells bearing the SMCT2 transporter, which has relatively low affinity for the SC-FAs, are suited to transport the high levels of dietary SC-FAs that are usually found in the proximal small intestine. Cells bearing the SMCT1 transporter, which has a relatively high affinity for the SC-FAs, are located in the large intestine and cecum. These cells are suited to take up the relatively low concentrations of the SC-FAs that are present in these sites. The SC-FAs in the gastrointestinal tracts diffuse into the intestinal wall and transported by SMCT2 (and other intestinal SC-FA transporters) serve as energy sources for cells located in the intestinal wall and throughout the body. They also stimulate various functions in cells of the intestine and throughout the body that express one of the SC-FA receptors, i.e., free fatty acid receptor 2, free fatty acid receptor 3, or hydroxycarboxylic acid receptor 2. (For the functions elicited by SC-FA's activation of these receptors see free fatty acid receptor 2 functions, free fatty acid receptor 3 functions, and hydroxycarboxylic acid receptor 2 functions.) In addition, the SC-FAs that enter cells can directly activate certain signal transduction pathways and thereby elicit cellular responses independently of the three cited SC-FA receptors.

=== Urinary tract ===
Studies in mice indicate that SMCT2 is located in the brush borders of the cells lining the kidney's proximal tubules with decreasing numbers of SMTC2-expressing cells in proximal tubule segments S1, S2, and S3. In contrast, SMCT1 is mostly limited to the S3, i.e., most distal, segment of the proximal tubules. Thus, the kidney's proximal tubules consist of SMCT1-bearing cells that transfer the higher levels of SC-FAs found in the proximal tubules while the SMCT1-bearing cells are active in transferring the lower levels of SC-FAs in more distal part of the proximal tubules. Other studies have shown that 1) mice lacking SMCT1 due to the knockout of their Slc8a5 gene had massive increases in the levels of lactic acid in their urine and 2) C/ebpδ gene knockout mice (these mice do not express SCMT1 or SCMT2 in their kidney tissues) likewise have a marked increase in urinary excretion of lactic and also show decreases in their lactic acid blood levels. These findings indicate that, in mice, SMCT1 is involved in the reabsorption of urine SC-FAs and that SMCT2 may also do so but studies on SLC5A12 gene knockout mice are needed to prove this.

=== Eyes ===
Müller cells (also termed Müller glia) are critical non-neural components of the retina. They form and maintain the retina's structure, control retinal immune responses by, e.g., releasing inflammatory mediators and engulfing dead cell debris, and provide retinal neurons with essential nutrients, particularly the SC-FA, pyruvic acid. SMCT2 has been detected in the Müller cells of mouse retinas and, based on indirect studies, the human rMC-1 Müeller cell line. These studies suggest that the function of SMCT2 in the retinal Müller cells of mice and humans is to take up SC-FAs and transfer of them to retinal neurons for their use as energy sources, particularly at times when other energy sources are less available.

=== Skeletal muscle ===
Skeletal muscles accumulate lactic acid during their contractions. This lactic acid, particularly if in excess, moves out of the skeletal muscles and either diffuses into the systemic circulation or is transferred into skeletal muscles that do not have an excessive buildup of lactic acid. The transfer of lactic acid out and into human skeletal muscle has been thought to be mediated by the H^{+}-coupled monocarboxylate transporters, MCT1 and MCT4. However, a more recent study detected SMCT2 and SMCT1 in the skeletal muscles of mice and suggested that they may contribute to the transport of SC-FAs in skeletal muscles in mice. Further studies are needed to determine if SCMT2 and/or SMCT1 are expressed by human skeletal muscle and contribute to the transport of lactic acid in mouse and/or human skeletal muscle.

== See also ==
Sodium-coupled monocarboxylate transporter 1
