= Lactate shuttle hypothesis =

Aspect of lactate metabolism

The lactate shuttle hypothesis describes the movement of lactate intracellularly (within a cell) and intercellularly (between cells). The hypothesis is based on the observation that lactate is formed and utilized continuously in diverse cells under both anaerobic and aerobic conditions. Furthermore, lactate produced at sites with high rates of glycolysis and glycogenolysis can be shuttled to adjacent or remote sites including heart or skeletal muscles where the lactate can be used as a gluconeogenic precursor or substrate for oxidation. The hypothesis was proposed in 1985 by George Brooks of the University of California at Berkeley.

In addition to its role as a fuel source predominantly in the muscles, heart, brain, and liver, the lactate shuttle hypothesis also relates the role of lactate in redox signalling, gene expression, and lipolytic control. These additional roles of lactate have given rise to the term "lactormone", pertaining to the role of lactate as a hormone.

== Lactate and the Cori cycle ==
Prior to the lactate shuttle hypothesis, lactate had long been considered a byproduct resulting from glucose breakdown through glycolysis in times of anaerobic metabolism. As a means of regenerating oxidized NAD^{+}, lactate dehydrogenase catalyzes the conversion of pyruvate to lactate in the cytosol, oxidizing NADH to NAD^{+}, regenerating the necessary substrate needed to continue glycolysis. Lactate is then transported from the peripheral tissues to the liver by means of the Cori cycle where it is reformed into pyruvate through the reverse reaction using lactate dehydrogenase. By this logic, lactate was traditionally considered a toxic metabolic byproduct that could give rise to fatigue and muscle pain during times of anaerobic respiration. Lactate was essentially payment for 'oxygen debt' defined by Hill and Lupton as the 'total amount of oxygen used, after cessation of exercise in recovery therefrom'.

== Cell-cell role of the lactate shuttle ==
In addition to Cori Cycle, the lactate shuttle hypothesis proposes complementary functions of lactate in multiple tissues. Contrary to the long-held belief that lactate is formed as a result of oxygen-limited metabolism, substantial evidence exists that suggests lactate is formed under both aerobic and anaerobic conditions, as a result of substrate supply and equilibrium dynamics.

=== Tissue use (brain, heart, muscle) ===
During physical exertion or moderate intensity exercise, lactate released from working muscle and other tissue beds is the primary fuel source for the heart, exiting the muscles through monocarboxylate transport protein (MCT). This evidence is supported by an increased amount of MCT shuttle proteins in the heart and muscle in direct proportion to exertion as measured through muscular contraction.

Furthermore, both neurons and astrocytes (neuron-adjacent cells) have been shown to express MCT proteins, suggesting that the lactate shuttle may be involved in brain metabolism. Astrocytes express MCT4, a low affinity transporter for lactate (Km = 35mM), suggesting its function is to export lactate produced by glycolysis. Conversely, neurons express MCT2, a high affinity transporter for lactate (Km = 0.7mM) (Note: Here, the Michaelis Constant ‘Km’, measured in milli-Molars, is used as a metric of transporter protein affinity.). Thus, it is hypothesized that the astrocytes produce lactate, which is then taken up by the adjacent neurons and oxidized for fuel. Further supporting this idea, studies have shown that astrocytes in the lateral hypothalamus release lactate into the extracellular space primarily via the monocarboxylate transporter MCT4. This lactate is then taken up by neighboring orexin neurons through MCT2, helping to sustain their activity and promote wakefulness

== Intracellular role of the lactate shuttle ==
The lactate shuttle hypothesis also explains the balance of lactate production in the cytosol, via glycolysis or glycogenolysis, and lactate oxidation in the mitochondria (described below).

=== Peroxisomes ===
MCT2 transporters within the peroxisome function to transport pyruvate into the peroxisome where it is reduced by peroxisomal lactate dehydrogenase (pLDH) to lactate. In turn, NADH is converted to NAD^{+}, regenerating this necessary component for subsequent β-oxidation. Lactate is then shuttled out of the peroxisome via MCT2, where it is oxidized by cytoplasmic LDH (cLDH) to pyruvate, generating NADH for energy use and completing the cycle (see figure).

=== Mitochondria ===
While the cytosolic fermentation pathway of lactate is well established, a novel feature of the lactate shuttle hypothesis is the oxidation of lactate in the mitochondria. Baba and Sherma (1971) were the first to identify the enzyme lactate dehydrogenase (LDH) in the mitochondrial inner membrane and matrix of rat skeletal and cardiac muscle. Subsequently, LDH was found in the rat liver, kidney, and heart mitochondria. It was also found that lactate could be oxidized as quickly as pyruvate in rat liver mitochondria. Because lactate can either be oxidized in the mitochondria (back to pyruvate for entry into the Krebs cycle, generating NADH in the process), or serve as a gluconeogenic precursor, the intracellular lactate shuttle has been proposed to account for the majority of lactate turnover in the human body (as evidenced by the slight increases in arterial lactate concentration). Brooks et al. confirmed this in 1999, when they found that lactate oxidation exceeded that of pyruvate by 10-40% in rat liver, skeletal, and cardiac muscle.

In 1990, Roth and Brooks found evidence for the facilitated transporter of lactate, monocarboxylate transport protein (MCT), in the sarcolemma vesicles of rat skeletal muscle. Later, MCT1 was the first of the MCT super family to be identified. The first four MCT isoforms are responsible for pyruvate/lactate transport. MCT1 was found to be the predominant isoform in many tissues including skeletal muscle, neurons, erythrocytes, and sperm. In skeletal muscle, MCT1 is found in the membranes of the sarcolemma, peroxisome, and mitochondria. Because of the mitochondrial localization of MCT (to transport lactate into the mitochondria), LDH (to oxidize the lactate back to pyruvate), and COX (cytochrome c oxidase, the terminal element of the electron transport chain), Brooks et al. proposed the possibility of a mitochondrial lactate oxidation complex in 2006. This is supported by the observation that the ability of muscle cells to oxidize lactate was related to the density of mitochondria. Furthermore, it was shown that training increases MCT1 protein levels in skeletal muscle mitochondria, and that corresponded with an increase in the ability of muscle to clear lactate from the body during exercise. The affinity of MCT for pyruvate is greater than lactate, however two reactions will ensure that lactate will be present in concentrations that are orders of magnitude greater than pyruvate: first, the equilibrium constant of LDH (K = 3.6 × 10^{4}) greatly favors the formation of lactate. Secondly, the immediate removal of pyruvate from the mitochondria (either via the Krebs cycle or gluconeogenesis) ensures that pyruvate is not present in great concentrations within the cell.

LDH isoenzyme expression is tissue-dependent. It was found that in rats, LDH-1 was the predominant form in the mitochondria of myocardium, but LDH-5 was predominant in the liver mitochondria. It is suspected that this difference in isoenzyme is due to the predominant pathway the lactate will take – in liver it is more likely to be gluconeogenesis, whereas in the myocardium it is more likely to be oxidation. Despite these differences, it is thought that the redox state of the mitochondria dictates the ability of the tissues to oxidize lactate, not the particular LDH isoform.

== Lactate as a signaling molecule: "lactormone" ==
=== Redox signaling ===
As illustrated by the peroxisomal intracellular lactate shuttle described above, the interconversion of lactate and pyruvate between cellular compartments plays a key role in the oxidative state of the cell. Specifically, the interconversion of NAD^{+} and NADH between compartments has been hypothesized to occur in the mitochondria. However, the evidence for this is lacking, as both lactate and pyruvate are quickly metabolized inside the mitochondria. However, the existence of the peroxisomal lactate shuttle suggests that this redox shuttle could exist for other organelles.

=== Gene expression ===
Increased intracellular levels of lactate can act as a signalling hormone, inducing changes in gene expression that will upregulate genes involved in lactate removal. These genes include MCT1, cytochrome c oxidase (COX), and other enzymes involved in the lactate oxidation complex. Additionally, lactate will increase levels of peroxisome proliferator activated receptor gamma coactivator 1-alpha (PGC1-α), suggesting that lactate stimulates mitochondrial biogenesis.

=== Control of lipolysis ===
In addition to the role of the lactate shuttle in supplying NAD^{+} substrate for β-oxidation in the peroxisomes, the shuttle also regulates FFA mobilization by controlling plasma lactate levels. Research has demonstrated that lactate functions to inhibit lipolysis in fat cells through activation of an orphan G-protein couple receptor (GPR81) that acts as a lactate sensor, inhibiting lipolysis in response to lactate .

== Role of lactate during exercise ==
As found by Brooks, et al., while lactate is disposed of mainly through oxidation and only a minor fraction supports gluconeogenesis, lactate is the main gluconeogenic precursor during sustained exercise.

Brooks demonstrated in his earlier studies that little difference in lactate production rates were seen in trained and untrained subjects at equivalent power outputs. What was seen, however, was more efficient clearance rates of lactate in the trained subjects suggesting an upregulation of MCT protein.

Local lactate use depends on exercise exertion. During rest, approximately 50% of lactate disposal take place through lactate oxidation whereas in time of strenuous exercise (50-75% VO_{2} max) approximately 75-80% of lactate is used by the active cell, indicating lactate's role as a major contributor to energy conversion during increased exercise exertion.

As of June 2026, Exogenous Lactate products have entered the Sports Nutrition market - including rumours such products will be used in the 2026 Tour de France. It remains to be seen / researched, how such products will influence and effect the lactate shuttle hypothesis.

== Clinical significance ==
Highly malignant tumors rely heavily on anaerobic glycolysis (metabolism of glucose to lactic acid even under ample tissue oxygen; Warburg effect) and thus need to efflux lactic acid via MCTs to the tumor micro-environment to maintain a robust glycolytic flux and to prevent the tumor from being "pickled to death". The MCTs have been successfully targeted in pre-clinical studies using RNAi and a small-molecule inhibitor alpha-cyano-4-hydroxycinnamic acid (ACCA; CHC) to show that inhibiting lactic acid efflux is a very effective therapeutic strategy against highly glycolytic malignant tumors.

In some tumor types, growth and metabolism relies on the exchange of lactate between glycolytic and rapidly respiring cells. This is of particular importance during tumor cell development when cells often undergo anaerobic metabolism, as described by the Warburg effect. Other cells in the same tumor may have access to or recruit sources of oxygen (via angiogenesis), allowing it to undergo aerobic oxidation. The lactate shuttle could occur as the hypoxic cells anaerobically metabolize glucose and shuttle the lactate via MCT to the adjacent cells capable of using the lactate as a substrate for oxidation. Investigation into how MCT-mediated lactate exchange in targeted tumor cells can be inhibited, therefore depriving cells of key energy sources, could lead to promising new chemotherapeutics.

Additionally, lactate has been shown to be a key factor in tumor angiogenesis. Lactate promotes angiogenesis by upregulating HIF-1 in endothelial cells. Thus a promising target of cancer therapy is the inhibition of lactate export, through MCT-1 blockers, depriving developing tumors of an oxygen source.
