= Indocyanine green =

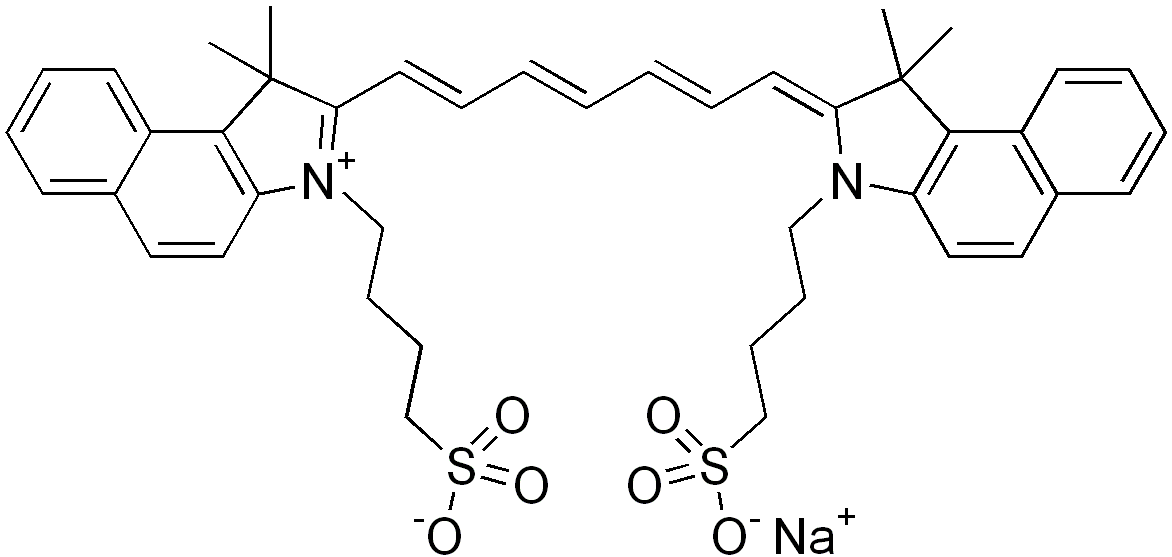

Names
- IUPAC name sodium 4-[2-[(1E,3E,5E,7Z)-7-[1,1-dimethyl-3-(4-sulfonatobutyl)benzo[e]indol-2-ylidene]hepta-1,3,5-trienyl]-1,1-dimethylbenzo[e]indol-3-ium-3-yl]butane-1-sulfonate
- Other names Cardiogreen; Foxgreen; Cardio-Green; Fox Green; IC Green; Spy Agent Green

Identifiers
| CAS Number | 3599-32-4 |
| 3D model (JSmol) | Interactive image |
| Beilstein Reference | 4115884 |
| ChEBI | CHEBI:31696 |
| ChEMBL | ChEMBL1646 |
| ChemSpider | 18108 |
| ECHA InfoCard | 100.020.683 |
| EC Number | 222-751-5 |
| IUPHAR/BPS | 4844 |
| KEGG | D01342 |
| PubChem CID | 5282412 |
| UNII | IX6J1063HV |
| CompTox Dashboard (EPA) | DTXSID2023145 |
- InChI: InChI=1S/C43H48N2O6S2.Na/c1-42(2)38(44(28-14-16-30-52(46,47)48)36-26-24-32-18-10-12-20-34(32)40(36)42)22-8-6-5-7-9-23-39-43(3,4)41-35-21-13-11-19-33(35)25-27-37(41)45(39)29-15-17-31-53(49,50)51;/h5-13,18-27H,14-17,28-31H2,1-4H3,(H-,46,47,48,49,50,51);/q;+1/p-1 Key: MOFVSTNWEDAEEK-UHFFFAOYSA-M; InChI=1/C43H48N2O6S2.Na/c1-42(2)38(44(28-14-16-30-52(46,47)48)36-26-24-32-18-10-12-20-34(32)40(36)42)22-8-6-5-7-9-23-39-43(3,4)41-35-21-13-11-19-33(35)25-27-37(41)45(39)29-15-17-31-53(49,50)51;/h5-13,18-27H,14-17,28-31H2,1-4H3,(H-,46,47,48,49,50,51);/q;+1/p-1 Key: MOFVSTNWEDAEEK-REWHXWOFAS
- SMILES: [Na+].[O-]S(=O)(=O)CCCC[N+]=3c2ccc1c(cccc1)c2C(C=3C=CC=CC=CC=C6N(c5ccc4ccccc4c5C6(C)C)CCCCS([O-])(=O)=O)(C)C

Properties
| Chemical formula | C_{43}H_{47}N_{2}NaO_{6}S_{2} |
| Molar mass | 774.96 g/mol |

Hazards
- GHS labelling
| Pictograms | (GHS07: Exclamation mark) |
| Signal word | Warning |
| Hazard statements | H315, H319, H335 |
| Precautionary statements | P261, P264, P271, P280, P302+P352, P304+P340, P305+P351+P338, P312, P321, P332+P313, P337+P313, P362, P403+P233, P405, P501 |

Pharmacology
| ATC code | V04CX01 (WHO) |
| Pregnancy category | AU: B2 |
| Legal status | AU: S4 (Prescription only) |
- Except where otherwise noted, data are given for materials in their standard state (at 25 °C [77 °F], 100 kPa). verify (what is ?) Infobox references

Indocyanine green (ICG) is a cyanine dye used in medical diagnostics. It is used for determining cardiac output, hepatic function, liver and gastric blood flow, and for ophthalmic and cerebral angiography. It has a peak spectral absorption at about 800 nm. These infrared frequencies penetrate retinal layers, allowing ICG angiography to image deeper patterns of circulation than fluorescein angiography. ICG binds tightly to plasma proteins and becomes confined to the vascular system. ICG has a half-life of 150 to 180 seconds and is removed from circulation exclusively by the liver to bile.

ICG is a fluorescent dye which is used in medicine as an indicator substance (e.g. for photometric hepatic function diagnostics and fluorescence angiography) in cardiac, circulatory, hepatic and ophthalmic conditions. It is administered intravenously and, depending on liver performance, is eliminated from the body with a half-life of about 3 to 4 minutes. ICG sodium salt is normally available in powder form and can be dissolved in various solvents; 5% (< 5% depending on batch) sodium iodide is usually added to ensure better solubility. The sterile lyophilisate of a water-ICG solution is approved in many European countries and the United States under the names ICG-Pulsion and IC-Green as a diagnostic for intravenous use.

== History ==
ICG was developed in the Second World War as a dye in photography and tested in 1957 at the Mayo Clinic for use in human medicine by I.J. Fox. After being granted FDA approval in 1959, ICG was initially used primarily in hepatic function diagnostics and later in cardiology. In 1964, S. Schilling was able to determine renal blood flow using ICG. From 1969, ICG was also used in the research and diagnosis of subretinal processes in the eye (in the choroid). In the years since 1980, the development of new types of cameras and better film material or new photometric measuring devices has cleared away many technical difficulties. In the meantime, the use of ICG in medicine (and especially in fluorescent angiography in ophthalmology) has become established as standard. A distinction is therefore also made, when describing fluorescent angiography, between NA fluorescent angiography and ICGA / ICG fluorescent angiography. Around 3,000 scientific papers on ICG have now been published worldwide.

== Optical properties ==
The absorption and fluorescence spectrum of ICG is in the near infrared region. Both depend largely on the solvent used and the concentration. ICG absorbs mainly between 600 nm and 900 nm and emits fluorescence between 750 nm and 950 nm. The large overlapping of the absorption and fluorescence spectra leads to a marked reabsorption of the fluorescence by ICG itself. The fluorescence spectrum is very wide. Its maximum values are approx. 810 nm in water and approx. 830 nm in blood. For medical applications based on absorption, the maximum absorption at approx. 800 nm (in blood plasma at low concentrations) is important. In combination with fluorescence detection, lasers with a wavelength of around 780 nm are used. At this wavelength, it is still possible to detect the fluorescence of ICG by filtering out scattered light from the excitation beam.

== Toxicity and side-effects ==
ICG is metabolized microsomally in the liver and only excreted via the liver and bile ducts; since it is not absorbed by the intestinal mucous membrane, the toxicity can be classified as low. Administration is not without risks during pregnancy. It has been known since September 2007 that ICG decomposes into toxic waste materials under the influence of UV light, creating a number of still unknown substances. A study published in February 2008, however, shows that ICG (the substance without UV effect) is basically, as such, of only minor toxicity. The intravenous LD_{50} values measured in animals are 60 mg/kg in mice and 87 mg/kg in rats. Occasionally – in one out of 42,000 cases – slight side-effects occur in humans such as sore throats and hot flushes. Effects such as anaphylactic shock, hypotension, tachycardia, dyspnea and urticaria only occurred in individual cases; the risk of severe side-effects rises in patients with chronic kidney impairment. The frequencies of mild, moderate and severe side-effects were only 0.15%, 0.2% and 0.05%; the rate of deaths is 1:333,333. For the competitor substance fluorescein, the proportion of people with side-effects is 4.8% and the death rate is 1:222,222.

== Uses ==
=== Uses in ophthalmology ===
==== Indocyanine green angiography ====
Because the preparation contains sodium iodide, a test must be carried out for iodine intolerance. Because around 5% of iodide is added, the iodine content of a 25 mg ampoule is 0.93 mg. In comparison, preparations for a bone marrow CT (140 ml) contain 300 mg/ml and for a corona angiography (200 ml) 350 mg/ml of iodine. ICG has the ability to bind 98% to plasma proteins – 80% to globulins and 20% to alpha-lipoprotein and albumin – and thus, in comparison with fluorescein as a marker, has a lower leakage (slower emergence of dye from the vessels, extravasally). Because of the plasma protein binding, ICG stays for up to 20 to 30 minutes in the vessels (intravasally). When the eye is examined, it thus stays for a long time in tissues with a higher blood flow, such as the choroid and the blood vessels of the retina.

==== Capsulorhexis ====
Capsulorhexis is a technique used to remove the lens capsule during cataract surgery. Various dyes are used to stain lens capsule during cataract surgery. In 1998, Horiguchi et al. first described the use of indocyanine green dye (0.5%) for capsular staining to assist cataract surgery. ICG-enhanced anterior and posterior capsulorhexis is useful in childhood cataract surgery. It may also use in adult cataract with no fundus glow. Although ICG is approved by the US FDA, there is still no approval for intraocular use of the dye.

=== Perfusion diagnostics of tissues and organs ===
ICG is used as a marker in the assessment of the perfusion of tissues and organs in many areas of medicine. The light needed for the excitation of the fluorescence is generated by a near infrared light source which is attached directly to a camera. A digital video camera allows the absorption of the ICG fluorescence to be recorded in real time, which means that perfusion can be assessed and documented.

In addition, ICG can also be used as a tracer in cerebral perfusion diagnostics. In the case of stroke patients, monitoring in the recovery phase seems to be achievable by measurement of both the ICG absorption and the fluorescence in everyday clinical conditions.

=== ICG-supported navigation for sentinel lymph node biopsy with tumors ===
Sentinel lymph node biopsy (SLB or SLN biopsy) allows selective, minimally invasive access for assessment of the regional lymph node status with malignant tumours. The first draining lymph node, the "sentinel", represents an existing or non-existing tumour of an entire lymph node region. The method has been validated using radionuclides and/or blue dye for breast cancer, melanoma and also gastrointestinal tumours and gives a good detection rate and sensitivity. For the SLB, a reduced mortality has been observed in comparison with complete lymph node dissection, but the methods have disadvantages with regard to availability, application and disposal of the radionuclide and the risk of anaphylaxis (up to 1%) for the blue dye. ICG, because of its near-infrared fluorescence and previous toxicity investigations, was evaluated in this investigation as a new, alternative method for SLB with regard to the clinical application of the transcutaneous navigation and lymph vessel visualisation and SLN detection. This technique is sometimes referred as fluorescence image-guided surgery (FIGS). ICG fluorescence navigation achieves high rates of detection and sensitivity in comparison with the conventional methods. Taking into account the learning curve required, the new, alternative method offers a combination of lymphography and SLB and the possibility of carrying out an SLB without the need for radioactive substances for solitary tumours

=== Selectively over-heating cells (especially cancer) ===
ICG absorbs near infra-red, especially light with a wavelength of about 805 nanometers. A laser of that wavelength can penetrate tissue. That means, dyeing tissue with injected ICG allows an 800 nm to 810 nm laser to heat or overheat the dyed tissue without harming the surrounding tissue. Although overheating is the main mechanism for it to kill cells, a small amount of the laser energy absorbed by the ICG releases free radicals such as singlet oxygen that also damage target cells.

That works particularly well on cancer tumors, because tumors naturally absorb more ICG than other tissue. When ICG is injected near tumors, tumors react to the laser 2.5 times as much as the surrounding tissue does. It is also possible to target specific cells by conjugating the ICG to antibodies such as daclizumab (Dac), trastuzumab (Tra), or panitumumab (Pan).

ICG and laser therapy has been shown to kill human pancreatic cancer cells (MIA PaCa-2, PANC-1, and BxPC-3) in vitro.

ICG and an infrared laser have also been used the same way to treat acne vulgaris.

=== Enzyme inhibitor against mushroom toxin ===
ICG is being studied as a possible antidote for the death cap mushroom toxin α-amanitin by inhibiting the enzyme STT3B.
