= FAM193A =

Protein-coding gene in the species Homo sapiens

Identifiers
- Aliases: FAM193A, C4orf8, RES4-22, family with sequence similarity 193 member A
- External IDs: MGI: 2447768; GeneCards: FAM193A

Gene location (Human)
Chr.	Chromosome 4 (human)
Band	4p16.3	Start	2,536,647 bp
Band	4p16.3	End	2,732,573 bp

Gene location (Mouse)
Chr.	Chromosome 5 (mouse)
Band	5|5 B2	Start	34,527,277 bp
Band	5|5 B2	End	34,643,800 bp
RNA expression pattern
Bgee	Human / Mouse (ortholog); Top expressed in: sural nerve; ventricular zone; testicle; oocyte; ganglionic eminence; secondary oocyte; Achilles tendon; cartilage tissue; right testis; tibialis anterior muscle / Top expressed in: zygote; secondary oocyte; otic vesicle; genital tubercle; tail of embryo; primary oocyte; hand; external carotid artery; internal carotid artery; neural layer of retina; More reference expression data
BioGPS	n/a
Orthologs
Databases	NCBI: entry; OMA: entry
Species	Human	Mouse
Entrez	8603	231128
Ensembl	ENSG00000125386	ENSMUSG00000037210
UniProt	P78312	Q8CGI1
RefSeq (mRNA)	NM_001256666; NM_001256667; NM_001256668; NM_003704; NM_001366316 NM_001366318	NM_001030306; NM_001243123
RefSeq (protein)	NP_001243595; NP_001243596; NP_001243597; NP_003695; NP_001353245 NP_001353247	NP_001230052
Location (UCSC)	Chr 4: 2.54 – 2.73 Mb	Chr 5: 34.53 – 34.64 Mb
PubMed search
- Wikidata
View/Edit Human	View/Edit Mouse

Family with sequence similarity 193 member A is a protein that in humans is encoded by the FAM193A gene located on locus p16.3 of chromosome 4. FAM193A is also known as C4orf8, chromosome 4 open reading frame 8, RES4-22, protein IT143, and hypothetical protein LOC86032.

== Gene ==
Comparing variation of splicing throughout the FAM193A gene using Ensembl, 11 transcripts were found of which three are erroneous or truncated proteins and two being retained introns from non-CDS transcripts. All transcripts represented reveal exactly same starting point with respect to exon 1. This continuity is seen throughout the 5’UTR in all alternatively spliced mRNAs, with the exception in splice variant 4. There are three areas within the expressed protein that possibly have motifs; leucine zipper within a coiled-coil. These three motifs lie within exon 5, 16 and 17. The areas are either expressed or entirely missed and other parts are expressed.

== Tissue distribution ==
The gene FAM193A is most abundantly expressed, by examination of spot intensity from its EST profile Hs.652364, in the embryonic, lymph node, nerve, uterus, testis, larynx tissues and somewhat in the blood. The gene is expressed through a number of health states, for example, adrenal, chondrosarcoma and uterine tumors, it is also implicated in soft tissue/ muscle tissue tumors.

A microarray from BRAINSPAN.org within the Prenatal LCM microarray data shows high abundance of FAM193A expression in humans ubiquitously throughout the brain. One of three probes showed very little gene expression of FAM193A (A_24_P126465). The most significant structures in terms of signal intensity from the microarray are; occipital lobe, hippocampal formation, globus pallidus, parahippocampal gyrus, amygdala, but relatively little expression in the insula.

== Regulation ==
FAM193A has several specific chemical–gene interactions curated from published literature. Interactions with Aflatoxin, a naturally occurring mycotoxin, was looked into for carcinogenic potential evaluated through application of chronic rodent bioassays. This compound increases the expression of FAM193A mRNA and by hierarchical clustering implicates this gene in processes related to macromolecules, cellular organization, and regulation.

Dihydrotestosterone is androgen of the male sex hormone. Androgen play an important role in maintenance and growth of prostate cells. In a study using prostate cancer cell line LNCaP treated with Dihydrotestosterone and bicalutamide for 6, 24, and 48 hours, researchers registered 56 different transcripts that showed homology to transcription factors, cell cycle regulators, metabolic enzymes, and hypothetical proteins. Of these FAM193A gene expression is upregulated in the presence of Dihydrotestosterone for 48 hours.

== Structure ==
Using NCBI’s cBLAST five structures were found that aligned somewhat to FAM193A. Of the structures only two were too were examined Chain A, RNA Polymerase Ii from Schizosaccharomyces Pombe and Chain A Tropomyosin. Comparison with the previous structure of the enzyme from the budding yeast Saccharomyces cerevisiae reveals differences in regions implicated in start site selection and transcription factor interaction. These aspects of the transcription mechanism differ between S. pombe and S. cerevisiae, but are conserved between S. pombe and humans. Amino acid changes apparently responsible for the structural differences are also conserved between S. pombe and humans, suggesting that the S. pombe structure may be a good surrogate for that of the human enzyme.

The predicted secondary structure of FAM193A examined through predictprotein.org showed that more than ¾ of the residues exposing more than 16% of their surface. This program also shows that FAM193A is approximately ½ alpha helical.

== Protein interactions ==
There is a novel gene, IRIZIO that cooperates with PAX3-FOXO1 fusion gene and may contribute to rhabdomyosarcomagenesis in children. This novel gene is homologous to the FAM193 A using the National Center for Biotechnology Information Basic Local Alignment Search Tool revealed an overall homology of 53%. Furthermore, the highest similarity is in the last 76 amino acids (89% homology) of both proteins.

== Quantitative trait locus ==
Quantitative trait locus:

Trait	Chromosome	position	p value
Prostate tumor susceptibility QTL 185	4	751,056 - 26,751,056	.0053
Myocardial infarction susceptibility QTL 19	4	1 - 13,115,992	
Prostate tumor susceptibility QTL 351	4	751,056 - 26,751,056	.00012

== Related genes ==
=== Orthologs ===
Primates, chimp and gibbon, represented the closest group of orthologous proteins in relation to humans (E range = 0.0-0.0), these along with others were used make a multiple sequence alignment (MSA). The MSA of the closest clade to humans all fell under the same duplication event. The avian (Zebra finch, chicken, turkey) and fish (Zebra fish, Pufferfish). were the animals that had attained this protein before the duplication event. These were found by BLASTing against the human genome. RNA Transcripts searched for BLASTp against the human genome produced no results of significance. Similarly, distantly related animals were found using BLASTp, but of the protein sequences matched, only small portions correlated with FAM193A.

=== Paralogs ===
Support for one paralog, FAM193B, shows homology to FAM193A's C-terminus end. FAM193B is 2961 nts long while FAM193A is 4710 and when aligned using Biology Workbench received a low score of -4490.
