= Mir-616 microRNA precursor family =

mir-616

Identifiers
- Symbol: mir-616
- Rfam: RF00995
- miRBase family: MIPF0000507

Other data
- RNA type: microRNA
- Domain(s): Eukaryota
- PDB structures: PDBe

mir-616 microRNA is a short non-coding RNA molecule belonging both to the family of microRNAs and to that of small interfering RNAs (siRNAs). MicroRNAs function to regulate the expression levels of other genes by several mechanisms, whilst siRNAs are involved primarily with the RNA interference (RNAi) pathway. miR-616 has been found to induce the specifically androgen-independent growth of prostate cancer cells.

== miR-616 and prostate cancer ==
miR-616 overexpression has been observed in androgen-independent prostate cancer cells, specifically in malignant tissue compared with benign forms. It is notably resistant to castration in LNCaP cells, due to an enhanced ability to proliferate in vivo. It has been found to interact with the tissue factor pathway inhibitor TFPI-2, and to directly target its mRNA at the three 3'UTR. Further, inhibition of TFPI-2 by miR-616 means inversely correlated expression of the two.

== See also ==
- MicroRNA
