= Monocarboxylate transporter 6 =

Protein-coding gene in the species Homo sapiens

SLC16A5

Identifiers
- Aliases: SLC16A5, MCT5, MCT6, solute carrier family 16 member 5, Monocarboxylate transporter 6
- External IDs: OMIM: 603879; MGI: 2443515; GeneCards: SLC16A5

Gene location (Human)
Chr.	Chromosome 17 (human)
Band	17q25.1	Start	75,087,727 bp
Band	17q25.1	End	75,106,162 bp

Gene location (Mouse)
Chr.	Chromosome 11 (mouse)
Band	11|11 E2	Start	115,353,300 bp
Band	11|11 E2	End	115,365,224 bp
RNA expression pattern
Bgee	Human / Mouse (ortholog); Top expressed in: bronchial epithelial cell; mucosa of transverse colon; right uterine tube; pancreatic ductal cell; upper lobe of left lung; oocyte; duodenum; right lung; epithelium of nasopharynx; monocyte / Top expressed in: thymus; jejunum; right kidney; duodenum; epithelium of stomach; colon; left colon; embryo; human kidney; ileum; More reference expression data
BioGPS	n/a
Gene ontology
Molecular function	symporter activity; monocarboxylic acid transmembrane transporter activity
Cellular component	integral component of membrane; plasma membrane; integral component of plasma membrane; membrane
Biological process	monocarboxylic acid transport; transmembrane transport
Sources:Amigo / QuickGO
Orthologs
Databases	NCBI: entry; OMA: entry
Species	Human	Mouse
Entrez	9121	217316
Ensembl	ENSG00000170190	ENSMUSG00000045775
UniProt	O15375	G5E8K6
RefSeq (mRNA)	NM_001271765; NM_004695; NM_001369668	NM_001080934; NM_001359606; NM_001359608; NM_001359609
RefSeq (protein)	NP_001258694; NP_004686; NP_001356597	NP_001074403; NP_001346535; NP_001346537; NP_001346538
Location (UCSC)	Chr 17: 75.09 – 75.11 Mb	Chr 11: 115.35 – 115.37 Mb
PubMed search
- Wikidata
View/Edit Human	View/Edit Mouse

Monocarboxylate transporter 6 (MCT6) is a protein in humans that is encoded by the SLC16A5 gene.

This gene encodes a member of the monocarboxylate transporter family and the major facilitator superfamily. The encoded protein is localized to the cell membrane and acts as a proton-linked transporter of bumetanide. Transport by the encoded protein is inhibited by four loop diuretics, nateglinide, thiazides, probenecid, and glibenclamide. Alternative splicing results in multiple transcript variants. [provided by RefSeq, Nov 2012].
