= BxPC-3 =

BxPC-3 (BxPC3) is a human pancreatic cancer cell line used in the study of pancreatic adenocarcinomas and treatments thereof.

BxPC-3 cells were derived from a 61-year-old female in 1986, and were confirmed to be tumorigenic in athymic nude mice, with moderate differentiation. The cells produce mucin, and exhibit an epithelial morphology. BxPC-3 cells lack a KRAS mutation, though it is commonly found in pancreatic cancers. BxPC-3 cells, along with JoPaca-1 cells, have high expression of cancer stem cell markers.

BxPC-3 has been used in tumorigenicity studies, pancreatic cancer therapy research, and other biomedical applications. The cells have been additionally studied for their phenotypic and genotypic properties as they can be applied to pancreatic cancer drug development; in particular, BxPC-3 cells have high expression of the angiogenic factors IL-8, VEGF, and PGE2, which can serve as potential drug targets.

== See also ==
- DU145
- MIA PaCa-2
- PANC-1
