= Bromopyruvic acid =

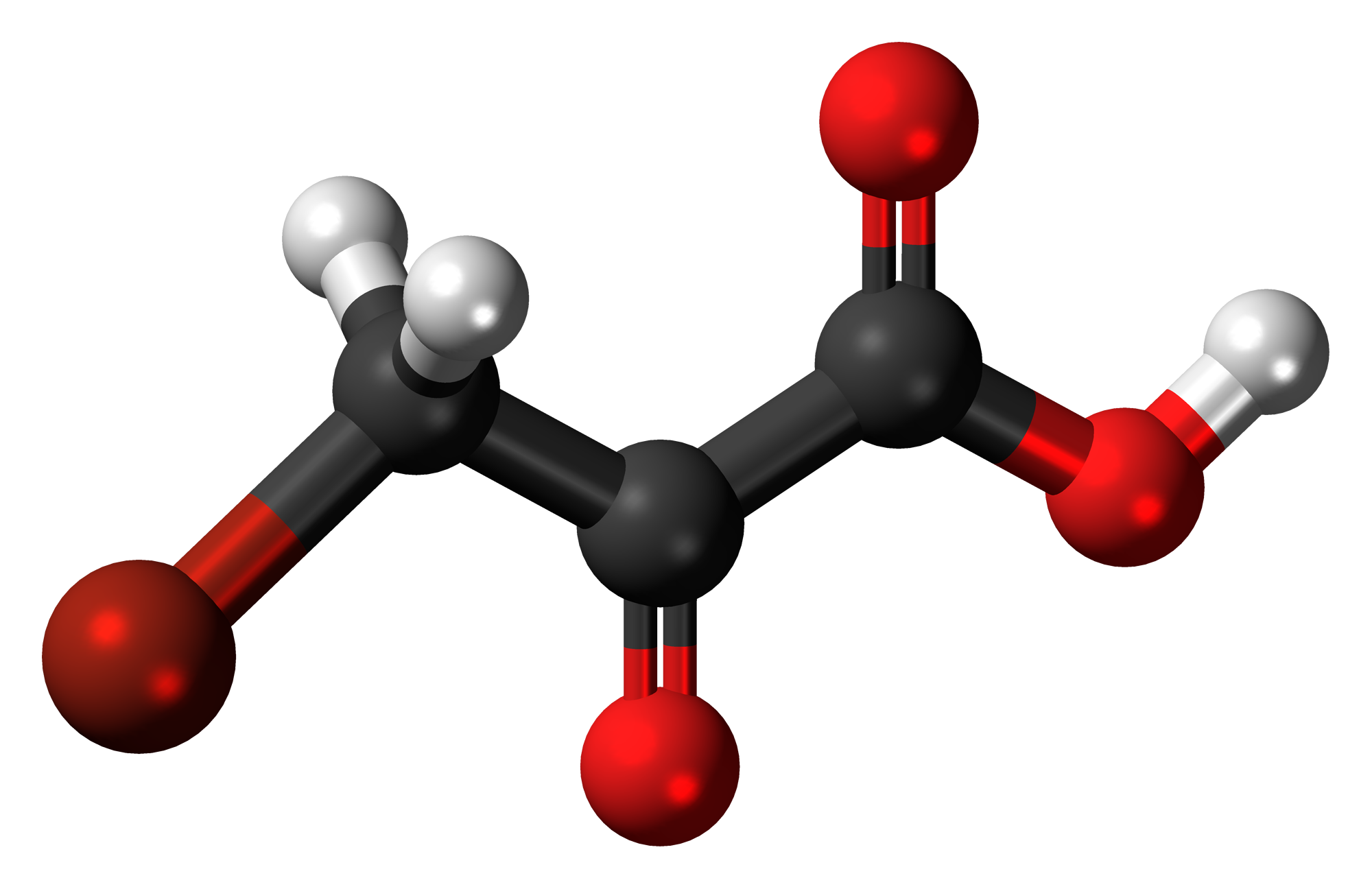

Names
- Preferred IUPAC name 3-Bromo-2-oxopropanoic acid
- Other names Bromopyruvate; 3-Bromopyruvic acid 3-Bromopyruvate; 3-BrPA; 3BP; 3-Br-Pyr

Identifiers
CAS Number	1113-59-3
3D model (JSmol)	Interactive image; Interactive image
ChEBI	CHEBI:131461
ChEMBL	ChEMBL177837
ChemSpider	63850
ECHA InfoCard	100.012.915
EC Number	214-206-5
PubChem CID	70684
UNII	63JMV04GRK
CompTox Dashboard (EPA)	DTXSID7040940
- InChI: InChI=1S/C3H3BrO3/c4-1-2(5)3(6)7/h1H2,(H,6,7) Key: PRRZDZJYSJLDBS-UHFFFAOYSA-N; InChI=1/C3H3BrO3/c4-1-2(5)3(6)7/h1H2,(H,6,7) Key: PRRZDZJYSJLDBS-UHFFFAOYAU
- SMILES: C(C(=O)C(=O)O)Br; BrCC(=O)C(=O)O

Properties
Chemical formula	C_{3}H_{3}BrO_{3}
Molar mass	166.958 g·mol^{−1}
Appearance	white solid
Melting point	79 to 82 °C (174 to 180 °F; 352 to 355 K) (hydrate)

Hazards
- GHS labelling
Pictograms	(GHS05: Corrosive)
Signal word	Danger
Hazard statements	H290, H314
Precautionary statements	P260, P264, P280, P301+P330+P331, P303+P361+P353, P304+P340, P305+P351+P338, P310, P321, P363, P405, P501
- Except where otherwise noted, data are given for materials in their standard state (at 25 °C [77 °F], 100 kPa). verify (what is ?) Infobox references

Bromopyruvic acid is the organic compound with the formula BrCH_{2}COCO_{2}H. This colorless solid is the brominated derivative of pyruvic acid. It bears structural similarity to lactic acid and pyruvic acid. It has been investigated as a metabolic poison and an anticancer agent. Like other α-bromoketones, it is a strong alkylating agent.

== Research ==
Bromopyruvic acid attracts attention in the biomedical research capacity through its potential to inhibit tyrosine phosphatases. Activity of such phosphatases is required for the activation of platelets, especially in a process called venous thromboembolism, a major cause of mortality during gastrointestinal cancer. Bromopyruvic-mediated inhibition of tyrosine phosphatases can counteract such thromboembolism and is investigated as novel angel to combat cancer-associated mortality. The pyruvate transporter system can be used to deliver bromopyruvate inside trypanosomal cells. Once intracellular, the primary target of 3BP is glyceraldehyde-3-phosphate dehydrogenase, which is highly sensitive to inhibition by bromopyruvate. The pyruvate transporter system, which is known to be overexpressed in cancer cells, was later identified to be a monocarboxylate transporter called monocarboxylate transporter 1.
