= Monocarboxylate transporter 2 =

Protein-coding gene in the species Homo sapiens

SLC16A7

Identifiers
- Aliases: SLC16A7, MCT2, solute carrier family 16 member 7
- External IDs: OMIM: 603654; MGI: 1330284; GeneCards: SLC16A7

Gene location (Human)
Chr.	Chromosome 12 (human)
Band	12q14.1	Start	59,596,029 bp
Band	12q14.1	End	59,789,855 bp

Gene location (Mouse)
Chr.	Chromosome 10 (mouse)
Band	10|10 D3	Start	125,055,139 bp
Band	10|10 D3	End	125,225,334 bp
RNA expression pattern
Bgee	Human / Mouse (ortholog); Top expressed in: right ventricle; renal medulla; vena cava; pericardium; sperm; cardia; myocardium of left ventricle; Skeletal muscle tissue of biceps brachii; superior surface of tongue; body of tongue / Top expressed in: spermatid; seminiferous tubule; spermatocyte; seminal vesicula; epithelium of stomach; right kidney; transitional epithelium of urinary bladder; human kidney; parotid gland; hair follicle; More reference expression data
BioGPS	n/a
Gene ontology
Molecular function	pyruvate transmembrane transporter activity; symporter activity; pyruvate secondary active transmembrane transporter activity; lactate transmembrane transporter activity; monocarboxylic acid transmembrane transporter activity
Cellular component	integral component of membrane; plasma membrane; integral component of plasma membrane; membrane
Biological process	monocarboxylic acid transport; lactate transmembrane transport; pyruvate transmembrane transport; transmembrane transport
Sources:Amigo / QuickGO
Orthologs
Databases	NCBI: entry; OMA: entry
Species	Human	Mouse
Entrez	9194	20503
Ensembl	ENSG00000118596	ENSMUSG00000020102
UniProt	O60669	O70451
RefSeq (mRNA)	NM_001270622; NM_001270623; NM_004731	NM_011391; NM_001358496; NM_001358915
RefSeq (protein)	NP_001257551; NP_001257552; NP_004722	NP_035521; NP_001345425; NP_001345844
Location (UCSC)	Chr 12: 59.6 – 59.79 Mb	Chr 10: 125.06 – 125.23 Mb
PubMed search
- Wikidata
View/Edit Human	View/Edit Mouse

Monocarboxylate transporter 2 (MCT2) also known as solute carrier family 16 member 7 (SLC16A7) is a protein that in humans is encoded by the SLC16A7 gene. MCT2 is a proton-coupled monocarboxylate transporter. It catalyzes the rapid transport across the plasma membrane of many monocarboxylates such as lactic acid, branched-chain oxo acids derived from leucine, valine, and isoleucine, and the ketone bodies acetoacetate and beta-hydroxybutyrate. It also functions as high-affinity pyruvate transporter.

Both Northern blot analysis and inspection of the human expressed sequence tag (EST) database suggest relatively little expression of MCT2 in human tissues. As well, the sequence of MCT2 is far less conserved across species than that of MCT1 or MCT4 and there also appear to be considerable species differences in the tissue expression profile of this isoform.

Of the four known mammalian lactate transporters (MCTs 1-4), MCT2 harbors the highest affinity for lactate. In parallel, MCT2 gene transcription has been demonstrated to respond with high-sensitivity to hypoxia, intracellular pH, and, to lactate.

== See also ==
- Monocarboxylate transporter
