= PANC-1 =

PANC-1 is a human pancreatic cancer cell line isolated from a pancreatic carcinoma of ductal cell origin.

PANC-1 was derived from the tissue of a 56-year-old male. The cells can metastasize but have poor differentiation abilities. PANC-1 cells take 52 hours to double in population, have a modal chromosome number of 63, and show G6PD of the slow mobility type. PANC-1 cells are known to have an epithelial morphology and are adherent in cell culture flasks. The cells can be frozen and regrown in culture, provided that they are appropriately warmed. Additionally, PANC-1 cells have a tendency to clump, a feature which can be avoided with trypsinization.

PANC-1 cells have been used to study the role of keratin reorganization during the migration of cancer cells, along with calcium-mediated actin reset in response to physiological changes.

== See also ==
- DU145
- BxPC-3
- MIA PaCa-2
