= Monocarboxylate transporter 9 =

Protein-coding gene in the species Homo sapiens

SLC16A9

Identifiers
- Aliases: SLC16A9, C10orf36, MCT9, solute carrier family 16 member 9
- External IDs: OMIM: 614242; MGI: 1914109; GeneCards: SLC16A9

Gene location (Human)
Chr.	Chromosome 10 (human)
Band	10q21.2	Start	59,650,764 bp
Band	10q21.2	End	59,736,002 bp

Gene location (Mouse)
Chr.	Chromosome 10 (mouse)
Band	10|10 B5.3	Start	70,080,930 bp
Band	10|10 B5.3	End	70,121,798 bp
RNA expression pattern
Bgee	Human / Mouse (ortholog); Top expressed in: left adrenal cortex; right adrenal cortex; nasal epithelium; mucosa of colon; mucosa of sigmoid colon; mucosa of ileum; human kidney; gums; gingival epithelium; ventricular zone / Top expressed in: retinal pigment epithelium; meninges; right lung; human kidney; right kidney; right lung lobe; proximal tubule; ciliary body; lumbar spinal ganglion; aortic valve; More reference expression data
BioGPS	n/a
Gene ontology
Molecular function	protein binding; symporter activity; monocarboxylic acid transmembrane transporter activity
Cellular component	plasma membrane; membrane; integral component of membrane; integral component of plasma membrane
Biological process	urate metabolic process; transmembrane transport; monocarboxylic acid transport
Sources:Amigo / QuickGO
Orthologs
Databases	NCBI: entry; OMA: entry
Species	Human	Mouse
Entrez	220963	66859
Ensembl	ENSG00000165449	ENSMUSG00000037762
UniProt	Q7RTY1	Q7TM99
RefSeq (mRNA)	NM_194298; NM_001323977; NM_001323978; NM_001323979; NM_001323980 NM_001323981	NM_025807
RefSeq (protein)	NP_001310906; NP_001310907; NP_001310908; NP_001310909; NP_001310910 NP_919274	NP_080083
Location (UCSC)	Chr 10: 59.65 – 59.74 Mb	Chr 10: 70.08 – 70.12 Mb
PubMed search
- Wikidata
View/Edit Human	View/Edit Mouse

Monocarboxylate transporter 9 (MCT9, solute carrier family 16, member 9, SLC16A9) is a protein that in humans is encoded by the SLC16A9 gene.

== Clinical relevance ==
Mutations in the SLC16A9 gene have been associated with carnitine levels in blood.
