= Monocarboxylate transporter 3 =

Protein-coding gene in the species Homo sapiens

SLC16A8

Identifiers
- Aliases: SLC16A8, MCT3, REMP, solute carrier family 16 member 8
- External IDs: OMIM: 610409; MGI: 1929519; GeneCards: SLC16A8

Gene location (Human)
Chr.	Chromosome 22 (human)
Band	22q13.1	Start	38,078,134 bp
Band	22q13.1	End	38,084,184 bp

Gene location (Mouse)
Chr.	Chromosome 15 (mouse)
Band	15|15 E1	Start	79,135,214 bp
Band	15|15 E1	End	79,138,961 bp
RNA expression pattern
Bgee	Human / Mouse (ortholog); Top expressed in: retinal pigment epithelium; testicle; nucleus accumbens; sural nerve; gonad; C1 segment; right uterine tube; putamen; Descending thoracic aorta; ascending aorta / Top expressed in: retinal pigment epithelium; choroid plexus of fourth ventricle; Epithelium of choroid plexus; gastrula; embryo; CA3 field; ciliary body; embryo; saccule; ectoderm; More reference expression data
BioGPS	n/a
Gene ontology
Molecular function	symporter activity; lactate transmembrane transporter activity; monocarboxylic acid transmembrane transporter activity
Cellular component	integral component of plasma membrane; plasma membrane; membrane; integral component of membrane
Biological process	monocarboxylic acid transport; pyruvate metabolic process; leukocyte migration; lactate transport; transmembrane transport; lactate transmembrane transport
Sources:Amigo / QuickGO
Orthologs
Databases	NCBI: entry; OMA: entry
Species	Human	Mouse
Entrez	23539	57274
Ensembl	ENSG00000100156	ENSMUSG00000032988
UniProt	O95907	O35308
RefSeq (mRNA)	NM_013356; NM_001394131	NM_020516
RefSeq (protein)	NP_037488	NP_065262
Location (UCSC)	Chr 22: 38.08 – 38.08 Mb	Chr 15: 79.14 – 79.14 Mb
PubMed search
- Wikidata
View/Edit Human	View/Edit Mouse

Monocarboxylate transporter 3 (MCT3) also known as solute carrier family 16 member 8 is a protein that in humans is encoded by the SLC16A8 gene. MCT is a proton-coupled monocarboxylate transporter. It catalyzes the rapid transport across the plasma membrane of many monocarboxylates such as lactate, pyruvate, branched-chain oxo acids derived from leucine, valine and isoleucine, and the ketone bodies acetoacetate, beta-hydroxybutyrate and acetate. It also functions as high-affinity pyruvate transporter.

Expression of SLC16A8 is confined to the retinal pigment epithelium and choroid plexus epithelia, where it is located on the basal membrane in contrast to MCT1 which is found on the apical membrane.

== See also ==
- Monocarboxylate transporter
