= Xanthatin =

Chemical compound

Identifiers
- IUPAC name: (3aR,7S,8aS)-7-methyl-3-methylidene-6-[(E)-3-oxobut-1-enyl]-4,7,8,8a-tetrahydro-3aH-cyclohepta[b]furan-2-one
- CAS Number: 26791-73-1
- PubChem CID: 5281511
- ChemSpider: 4444844
- UNII: 298X1N12LS
- CompTox Dashboard (EPA): DTXSID001317668

Chemical and physical data
- Formula: C_{15}H_{18}O_{3}
- Molar mass: 246.306 g·mol^{−1}
- 3D model (JSmol): Interactive image
- SMILES: CC1CC2C(CC=C1C=CC(=O)C)C(=C)C(=O)O2
- InChI: InChI=InChI=1S/C15H18O3/c1-9-8-14-13(11(3)15(17)18-14)7-6-12(9)5-4-10(2)16/h4-6,9,13-14H,3,7-8H2,1-2H3/b5-4+/t9-,13+,14-/m0/s1

Xanthatin, or (3aR,7S,8aS)-7-methyl-3-methylidene-6-[(E)-3-oxobut-1-enyl]-4,7,8,8a-tetrahydro-3aH-cyclohepta[b]furan-2-one (C_{15}H_{18}O_{3}) is a major bioactive compound found in the leaves of the Xanthium strumarium (Asteracae) plant. It is classified as a natural sesquiterpene lactone. Xanthatin is believed to have anti-inflammatory, anti-tumour, anti-microbial, and anti-parasitic properties hence it is being researched for potential use in treatment of cancer and autoimmune diseases. While it has been used in traditional medicine for decades, its mechanisms and modern use haven't been fully understood yet.

== History ==
=== Traditional usage ===
Xanthium strumarium L. (Asteracae) has been used thousands of years as Chinese herbal medicine (named Cangerzi). Its leaves have shown anti-inflammatory, analgesic, anti-asthmatic, anti-microbial, and diuretic properties in an herbal supplement before it was known that xanthatin was the main bioactive compound.

In 1963, the fruits of Xanthium strumarium L. were listen in the Pharmacopoeia of the People's Republic of China.

=== Modern usage ===
In 1975, xanthatin was isolated from the leaves of the Xanthium strumarium and it was determined to be the predominant compound in these plant leaves. In the 21st century, in vitro, and in vivo research is performed on xanthatin showing promising results in anti-tumour, anti-inflammatory and antibacterial applications on various cell lines.

== Structure ==
Xanthatin is a sesquiterpene lactone. It consists of three isoprene units with a lactone ring attached resulting in a sesquiterpene derivative of C_{15}H_{18}O_{3} compared to the usual C_{15}H_{18}. During the synthesis of Xanthatin it was reported that a multitude of functional groups could be derived from the same synthetic pathway showing much promise for other medicinal candidates.

== Synthesis ==
Xanthatin was first reported to be enantioselective synthesized by Shishido. Further developments have shown that the synthesis can be adapted to form other xanthanolide analogues, which could be of medicinal interest. Many reaction steps are involved in the synthesis of Xanthatin a general overview is given with details below based on the research of Bergman et al.

Methyl-furoate (1) is the commercially available starting compound used. To form the ketone group and prepare seven membered ring formation asymmetric catalytic cyclopropanation, ozonolysis is used followed by allylation, realdolation and lactonization. An apple type reaction a chemoselective reduction of the aldehyde formed is used to form 2.

Knochel's protocol is used to provoke sp3-sp3 coupling with tert-butyl-2-(bromomethyl)acrylate after which the compound is used as a substrate in a ring closing metathesis reaction under influence of a Grubbs II catalyst. Giving rise to the bicyclic sesquiterpene skeleton of Xanthatin (3).

In order to form Xanthatin, more steps have to be executed. Due to the chair conformation of 3 it is sterically favored to form a single stereomere by execution of a Ene-reaction. The alcohol or ester that is formed can be removed by presence of CuCN and RLi in a SN2 like fashion.

The final steps include the formation of the exo-methylene group at the C-3 position, α to the lactone. Introducing this group is a difficult process since the molecule is already prone to unwanted side reactions. In order to achieve this a method involving base induced hydroxymethylation by gaseous formaldehyde following a pivalylation introduced a methanol group at the C-3. The tert-butylester needs to be stepwise hydrolysed towards an aldehyde. When the molecule was introduced to a strong base the desired α-methylene-γ-butyrolactone group was formed. A Makaiyama aldol condensation with trimethyl(prop-1-en-2-yloxy)silane is added for the complete synthesis of Xanthatin and its derivatives

== Mechanism of action ==
The exact mechanism of action of xanthatin is not exactly known. However, it was found that it works through various molecular pathways which all lead to apoptosis. One of these proposed pathways is that xanthatin inhibits the nuclear factor-kappa B (NF-κB) transcription factor which is critical for controlling cell proliferation. This would reduce inflammation and suppress growth of cancer cells. Another study suggests the same with addition of induced endoplasmic reticulum (ER) stress in glioma (brain cancer) which also leads to apoptosis. Oxidative stress is another pathway in which xanthatin works. It binds to selenocysteine (Sec) residue of TrxR enzyme which leads to irreversible inhibition. This leads to oxidative stress which can induce apoptosis.

== Metabolism ==
Xanthatin is classified as a sesquiterpene lactone, which can help to determine the metabolism of xanthatin, because metabolism of xanthatin is unknown. There are studies about the metabolism of different sesquiterpene lactones. Most of the sesquiterpene lactones are BCS II classified, which means that they have high permeability and low water solubility. After they entered the gastrointestinal tract, the absorption is poorly due to their pH sensitivity. Xanthatin contains a α-methylene-γ-butyrolactone, which is the main location of metabolism in other sesquiterpene lactones. However, there are metabolic differences in similar compounds with this reactive group. But phase I reactions such as oxidation, (de)hydration, hydroxylation, sequential desaturation, and epoxidation are found in different sesquiterpene lactones. (Acetyl)cysteine conjugation, methylation, glutathione conjugation are common phase II reactions in sesquiterpene lactones.

== Indications ==
In traditional medicine, some symptoms may occur at high doses. These may include vomiting, tremors, weak pulse, a loss of appetite, and convulsions.

== Efficacy ==
Traditionally, Xanthatin has been used in folk medicine. Xanthatin is a bioactive compound and possesses anti-inflammatory, analgesic, anti-asthmatic, anti-microbial, diuretic properties. However, scientific research of xanthatin is limited.

Scientific studies show that xanthatin can be anti-proliferative against various tumour cells in-vitro and in-vivo through inhibition and induce apoptosis. Xanthatin also consists of an anti-inflammatory activity by inhibiting PGE2 synthesis and 5-lipoxygenase activity.

=== Side effects ===
Research data about side effects has not been reported due to lack of human data.

== Toxicity ==
At high concentrations, xanthatin exhibits hepatotoxic effects, causing liver damage in mice. Xanthatin has been reported to promote apoptosis. Thus, this will also include cell proliferation of healthy tissue. In vitro, and in vivo research has shown that it can also cause DNA damage in regular cells.
