= MIA PaCa-2 =

Pancreatic cancer cell line

MIA PaCa-2 is a human pancreatic cancer cell line used extensively in pancreatic cancer research and therapy development.

In 1977, MIA PaCa-2 cells were derived from the carcinoma of a 65-year-old male.

The cells exhibit CK5.6, AE1/AE3, E-cadherin, vimentin, chromogranin A, synaptophysin, SSTR2, and NTR1, but not CD56. The cells have a round, epithelial morphology, and are adherent in cell culture.

MIA PaCa-2 has served for decades as a model of pancreatic cancer, and studies of MIA PaCa-2 physiology have helped clarify the mechanisms of carcinogenesis in pancreatic cancer, aid the development of cancer cell lysates targeting IgG production, and augmented drug-delivery methods relying on quantum dots.

== See also ==
- DU145
- PANC-1
- BxPC-3
