= PC3 =

Human prostate cancer cell line

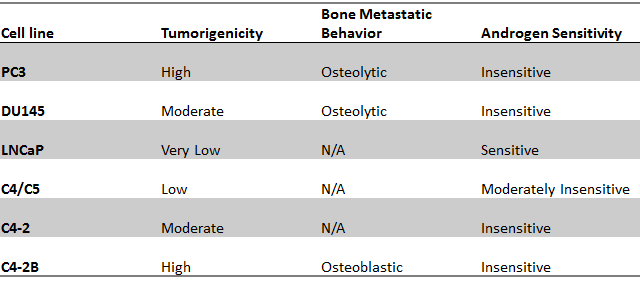
Properties of common prostate cancer cell lines

PC3 or PC-3 is a human prostate cancer cell line used in prostate cancer research and drug development. PC3 cells are useful in investigating biochemical changes in advanced prostate cancer cells and in assessing their response to chemotherapeutic agents. PC3 cells are also used to study viral infection in mammalian cells that exhibit an immune response.

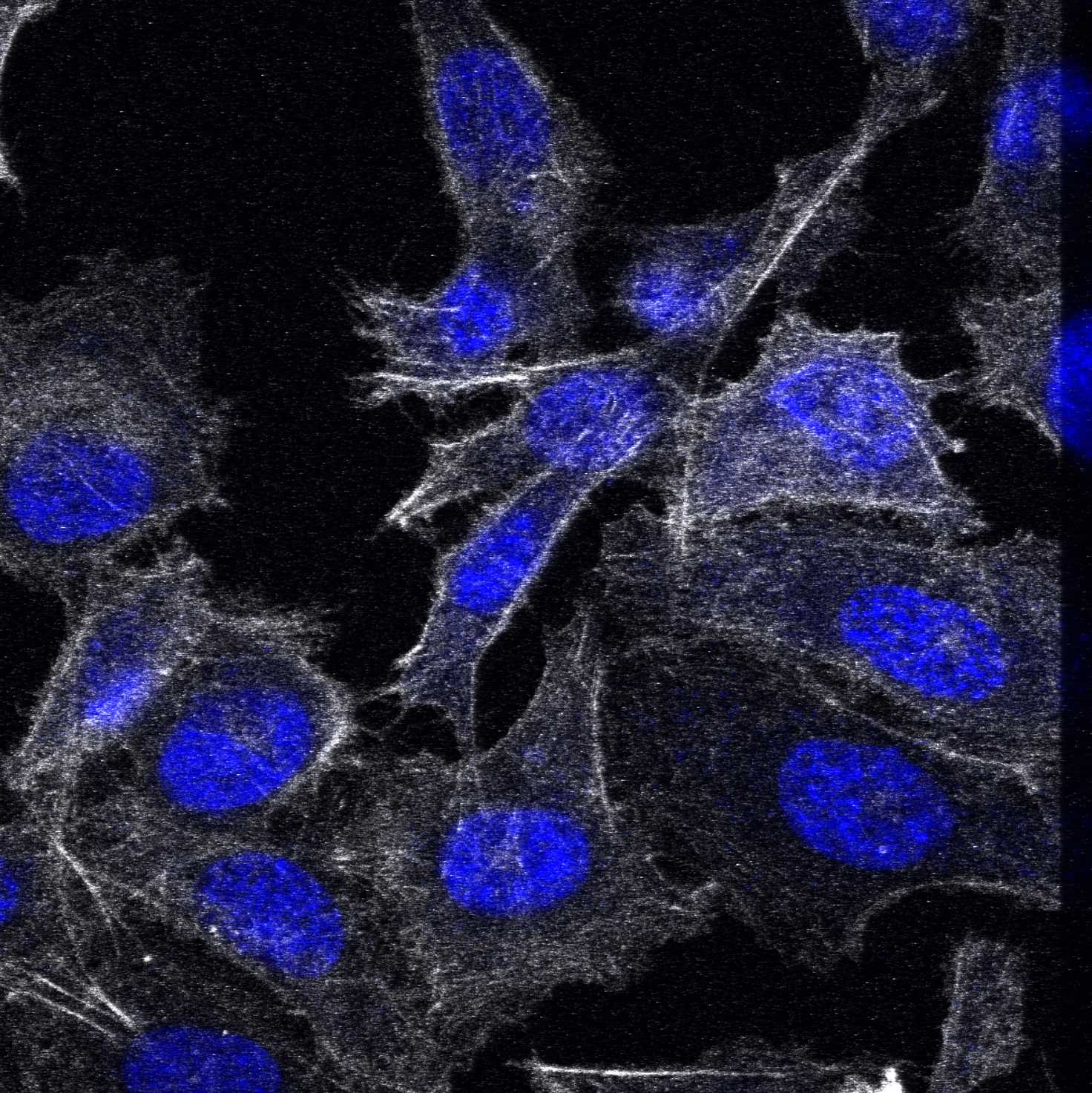
Actin (Phalloidin) and Nuclei (DAPI) staining

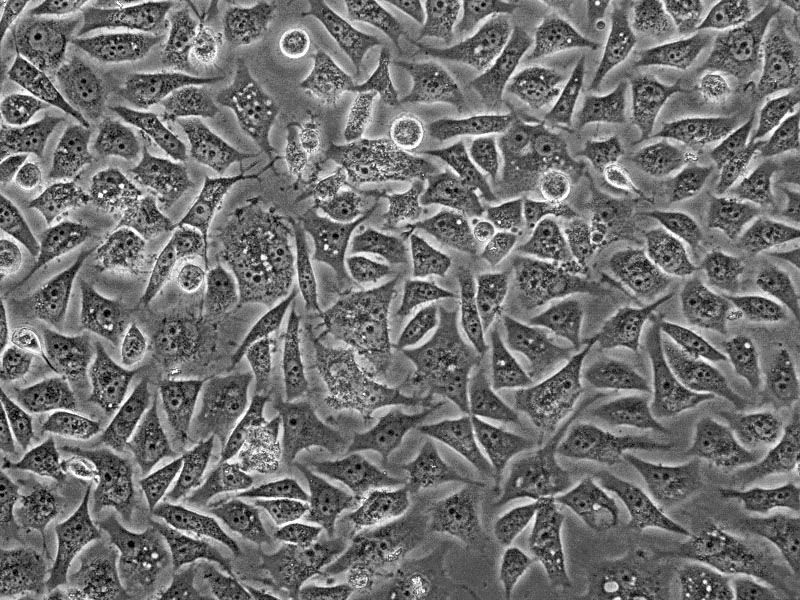
PC3 cell cultured in plastic plate

== History ==
The PC3 cell line was established in 1979 from lumbar vertebral metastasis of grade IV prostatic adenocarcinoma in a 62-year-old Caucasian male.

== Responses and behaviours ==
These cells do not respond to androgens, glucocorticoids or fibroblast growth factors, but results suggest that the cells are influenced by epidermal growth factors. PC3 cells have high metastatic potential (Note: DU145 cells have a moderate potential, LNCaP, low.) Comparisons of the protein expression of PC3, LNCaP, and other cells have shown that PC3 is characteristic of small cell neuroendocrine carcinoma.

PC3 cells have low testosterone-5-alpha reductase and acidic phosphatase activity, and do not express PSA (prostate-specific antigen).

== Characteristics ==
Karyotypic analysis: near-triploid, having 62 chromosomes. (Note: Donkeys, Lymantria dispar, Scarlet macaws all naturally have 62 chromosomes (see: List of organisms by chromosome count)) Expression of CK7, CK8, CK18, and CK19, non AR and PSA. From a morphological point of view, electron microscopy revealed that PC3 cells show characteristics of a poorly-differentiated adenocarcinoma. Tumor size approximately 100 % increase: approximately 33 h. They have features common to neoplastic cells of epithelial origins, such as numerous microvilli, junctional complexes, abnormal nuclei and nucleoli, abnormal mitochondria, annulate lamellae, and lipoidal bodies. Q-band analysis showed no Y chromosome.

== Lines of PC3 cells ==
There are a variety of Different PC3 cell lines derived from the original PC3 cell line. The most common include PC3-PR Cells, PC-3M Cells, PC3-EGFP Cells, PC3-Dox Cells, PC3-LacZ Cells, PC3-AR Cells. Each of these have different morphological and physiological properties but they all originate from the original PC3 cell derived from the 62-year old caucasian male.

=== PC3-PR Cells (Paclitaxel-Resistant) ===
C3-PR cells are Paclitaxel-Resistant cells that, unlike PC3 cells, are resistant with Paclitaxel (PTX). In these cells PTX is unable to stimulate p21 and acetylated α-tubulin expression of PC3-PR cells. Though Cabazitaxel and HDAC inhibitors were able to induce p21 and α-tubulin, these equally suppress PC3-PR cells. Due to the suppression ability of Cabazitaxel and HDAC, these drugs are able to replace the common chemotherapy drug in PC3-PR cells. These cells allow researchers to develop strategies in order to treat prostate cancer that is resistant to traditional chemotherapy drugs.

PC-3M Cells (Metastatic)

PC-3-M cells are a highly metastatic form of PC3 cells. They metastasize in a much more prolific fashion than regular PC3 cells. These cells are used in research to study the potential treatments of PC's that are highly metastatic. PC3-M is used in research from in-vitro to in-vivo model animals for cancer research. This cell line is able to research the most dangerous, advanced forms of pancreatic cancer, as the high metastasis potential will allow these cells to spread throughout the body in a rapid fashion.

PC3-EGFP Cells (Enhanced Green Fluorescent Protein)

PC3-EGFP are PC3 cells that have been modified in order to express green fluorescent proteins at a higher rate. This is visible when EGFP expression levels are analyzed. This allows for live tracking of PC3 cells as well as real time imaging. This can be especially useful when studying the proliferation as well as the drug response in PC3 cells.

PC3-Dox Cells

PC3-Dox cells are modified to be resistant to Doxorubicin. This cell line is used to study multidrug resistance (MDR) in PC3. Specifically miR-21 research is based on this lineage of cells in order to determine if it is possible to reverse (MDR) through the employment of this drug. Additionally these cells look at if it is possible to resensitize PC3 cells to Doxorubicin.

PC3-Ras Cells PC3-Ras cells are modified in order to express the oncogene ras. Ras is involved in the activation of downstream effectors that play a role in DNA transcription. This modification allows researchers to study the role of Ras signaling in prostate cancer. This is very important to studying the processes of tumor progression, metastasis, and drug resistance in pancreatic cancer cells, as it is tied to mitosis.

== Applications in science ==
PC3 cells can be used to create subcutaneous tumor xenografts in mice to investigate the tumor environment and therapeutic drug functionality.

=== Significance of PC3 in Prostate Cancer Research ===
Prostate cancer (PC) is the most common form of non-cutaneous malignant cancer in males, and is the second leading cause of cancer deaths in males. PC3 cells have been utilized to research aggressive and castration-resistant forms of prostate cancer. The androgen-independence of these cells during cell division makes them invaluable for studying the molecular mechanisms embedded in studying advanced prostate cancer. PC3 cells have been involved in research regarding the prevention and treatment of prostate cancer. PC3 cells have been used in research surrounding Methylene Blue Photodynamic Laser Therapy (MB-PDT) and Sulforaphane (SFN). Research published in 2023 utilizing PC3 cells illustrated that MB-PDT treatment decreased the antioxidant potential and increased lipid peroxidation, decreasing the viability and metastatic capacity of PC3 cells. The results from this study further support other research that MB-PDT can be used in conjunction with traditional therapies to treat aggressive versions of prostate cancers. SFN treatments have been used to treat prostate cancer as well as many other tumors. SFN is a plant-derived chemical present in many plants, especially broccoli and broccoli sprouts; though there are concerns about the bioavailability of SFN supplements. Nevertheless, many prostate cancer patients have turned to SFN to prevent growth of PCs resistant to many of the traditional forms of treatment. Experimentation in 2020 linked SFN to a decrease in prostate cancer proliferation and growth, using PC3 cells alongside DU145. These studies found that using treatments as low as 1 μM of SFN decreased PC3 cell count by 50% in-vitro.

=== in vitro study ===
Treatment by quercetin induced various tumor suppressor genes including transforming growth factor β receptor 11, and quenched reactive oxygen species.

== See also ==
- DU145
- LNCaP
