= LNCaP =

Cell line

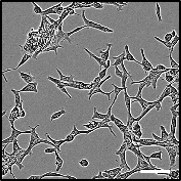
Representative phase-contrast image of LNCaP cells. Scale bars represent 100 μm.

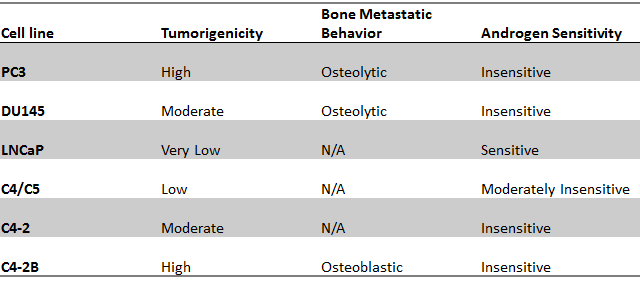
Properties of common PCa cell lines

LNCaP cells are a cell line of human cells commonly used in the field of oncology. LNCaP cells are androgen-sensitive human prostate adenocarcinoma cells derived from the left supraclavicular lymph node metastasis from a 50-year-old caucasian male in 1977. They are adherent epithelial cells growing in aggregates and as single cells.

One major obstacle to conducting the most clinically relevant prostate cancer (PCa) research has been the lack of cell lines that closely mimic human disease progression. Two hallmarks of metastatic human prostate cancer include the shift of aggressive PCa from androgen-sensitivity to an Androgen Insensitive (AI) state, and the propensity of PCa to metastasize to bone. Although the generation of AI cell lines has been quite successful as demonstrated in the “classic” cell lines DU145 and PC3, the behavior of these cells in bone does not fully mimic clinical human disease. It is well established that human PCa bone metastasis form osteoblastic lesions rather than osteolytic lesions seen in other cancers like breast cancer. Similarly, PC-3 and DU145 cells form osteolytic tumors. To develop an AI-PCa cell model that more closely mimics clinical disease, LNCaP sublines have been generated to provide the most clinically relevant tissue culture tools to date.

== History ==
The LNCaP (Lymph Node Carcinoma of the Prostate) cell line was established from a metastatic lesion of human prostatic adenocarcinoma. The LNCaP cells grow readily in vitro (up to 8 × 10^{5} cells/sq cm; doubling time, 60 hr), form clones and are highly resistant to human fibroblast interferon. LNCaP cells have a modal chromosome number of 76 to 91, indicative of a human male karyotype with several marker chromosomes. The malignant properties of LNCaP cells are maintained in athymic nude mice which develop tumors at the injection site and show a similar doubling time in vivo.

High-affinity specific androgen and estrogen receptors are present in the cytosol and nuclear fractions. The LNCaP line is hormonally responsive, shown by in vitro 5 alpha-dihydrotestosterone modulation of cell growth and acid phosphatase production. LNCaP cells also express Prostate Specific Antigen (PSA). In vivo, Male mice develop tumors earlier and at a greater frequency than do females and hormonal manipulations show that the frequency of tumor development correlates with serum androgen levels. The rate of the tumor growth, however, is independent of the gender or hormonal status of the host.

== C4/C5 and C4-2 ==
Wu et al. (1994) reproduced the human-derived LNCaP tumors in immunocompromised mice by co-injection of LNCaP cells with MS human bone fibroblasts. Cells were subcutaneously injected at multiple sites into the mouse flank and after approximately 4 weeks of growth, tumors were easily detectable by physical examination and had a high rate of growth (17-33 mm3/day).

To replicate the hallmark shift of PCa cells to AI, LNCaP host mice were castrated by way of midscrotal incision at approximately 8 weeks post injection. Tumors were maintained in castrated hosts for 4 to 5 weeks at which time remaining tumors were harvested. In total, two subsets of cells were collected from castrated hosts: C4 and C5, collected at 4 and 5 weeks respectively.

To further select for AI-PCa cells, the C4 subline was co-injected with MS human fibroblasts into a castrated host. The resulting tumors were isolated and an additional subline was generated, C4-2.

Karyotype comparisons indicate that LNCaP cells grown in intact hosts (M subline) have a modal chromosomal distribution number of 83, C4 and C5 sublines with 85, and the C4-2 subline with 83.

To further verify that these cells were of human origin karyotype analysis determined that the parental LNCaP cells had 7 distinct marker chromosomes, with two copies of each. The M, C4, C5, and C4-2 sublines contained most of the marker chromosomes, with the M subline being most similar to the parental LNCaP cells. C4, C5 and C4-2 are only minutely distinct from LNCaP and the M subline with the addition of a marker chromosome resulting from a segment addition to chromosome 6. A Y chromosome is not present in most C4, C5 and C4-2 cells, suggesting major chromosomal alterations.

C4, C5, and C4-2 sublines grow well under identical tissue culture conditions as LNCaP with similar growth rates. Parental LNCaP, M, C4, and C5 subline have similar baseline gene expression levels of ornithine decarboxylase (ODC) and Prostate Specific Antigen (PSA) however, M, C4, and C5 sublines express 5-10X more PSA mRNA. M, C4, C5 and C4-2 also expressed reduced human androgen receptor mRNA as expected in AI cells.

Androgen Insensitivity All sublines were treated with dihydrotestosterone (DHT), a high-affinity ligand for AR. DHT treatment elicited markedly reduced growth in C4 and C5 cells and no growth in C4-2 cells when compared to the high rate of growth seen in LNCaP cells, suggesting reduced androgen sensitivity in C4 and C5 and AI in C4-2 cells. Whole-cell AR assay also indicated that LNCaP cells have a much higher affinity form of AR (Kd = 159 pM) when compared to C4-2 (Kd = 267 pM).

Tumorigenicity C4 and C5 sublines exhibit greatly increased tumorigenicity when injected in intact male mice, unlike parental LNCaP cells. C4 and C5 were also able to form highly vascularized carcinomas in castrated mice when co-injected with MS human fibroblasts. The C4-2 subline more readily forms tumors in intact hosts than C4 and C5 sublines and they are the only cells able to form tumors in castrated host without co-injection of MS human bone fibroblasts. These same C4-2 tumors stained for PSA and secreted high levels of PSA into the growth medium.

== C4-2B ==
To generate a bone metastatic subline, C4-2 cells were orthotopically injected into castrated male mice. These cells formed large primary tumors of the prostate, lymph nodes, as well as osseus tumors. Isolation of these osseus tumors resulted in the C4-2B subline. C4-2B cells were positive for PSA and cytokeratin 8, confirming their prostatic origin. Most importantly, immunohistochemical staining of the C4-2B tumors were positive for osteoblast activity suggesting the induction of osteoblastic tumor formation mirroring the progression of human PCa.

When cultured in a “promineralization medium” that contains ascorbic acid (known to promote skeletal-like ECM formation in osteoblasts) and a source of phosphate (for hydroxyapatite formation), C4-2B cells produce and retain approximately 8x more mineralized calcium than parental LNCaP cells. C4-2B cells also express higher levels of osteoprotegerin (OPG), alkaline phosphatase, bone sialoprotein (BSP), Osteocalcin (OCN), RANKL, and Osteonectin (OSN) mRNA, all of which are highly expressed by osteoblasts. Osteoblast promoter activity is also higher in C4-2B cells when compared to LNCaP, as indicated by Cbfa1 transcription factor expression. Concomitantly, BMP7, a known inducer of Cbfa1, is also more highly expressed in C4-2B cells, further suggesting many osteoblast-like properties.

== Androgen Independent Variants ==
LN95 cells were derived from LNCaP cultured in RPMI-1640 (without phenol red) with 10% charcoal stripped fetal bovine serum. LN95 cells differ from parental LNCaP cells morphologically, with pronounced dendritic extensions, and molecularly, with Androgen receptor variant expression similar to that of AR-V7^{High} VCaP cells. Notably, LN95 cells are significantly more tumour initiating than their parental counterparts in vivo.

LNCaP-AI (or LN-AI) cells were derived from 6-Month culture of LNCaP parental cells in charcoal stripped serum. While LNCaP-AI are wholly androgen independent, they retain high expression of Androgen receptor, low expression of AR-V7, and remain androgen responsive. The mechanism of the highly proliferative phenotype of LNCaP-AI cells appears to be loss of cell cycle regulator expression (p21, p16) and increased anti-apoptotic Bcl2 expression.
