= Monocarboxylate transporter =

The monocarboxylate transporters, or MCTs, are a family of proton-linked plasma membrane transporters that carry molecules having one carboxylate group (monocarboxylates), such as lactate, pyruvate, and ketones across biological membranes. Acetate is actively transported to intestinal enteroendocrine cells via MCT, termed Targ (short for Tarag in Mongolian). MCTs are expressed in nearly every kind of cell.

There are 14 MCTs corresponding to 14 solute carrier 16A transporters, although the cardinal numbers do not match (for example MCT3 is SLC16A8). MCTs 1-4 have been more carefully investigated than MCTs 5-14.

MCTs can be upregulated by PPAR-α, HIF-1α, Nrf2, and AMPK.

== Lactate and the Cori cycle ==
Lactate has long been considered a byproduct resulting from glucose breakdown through glycolysis during anaerobic metabolism. Glycolysis requires the coenzyme NAD^{+}, and reduces it to NADH. As a means of regenerating NAD^{+} to allow glycolysis to continue, lactate dehydrogenase catalyzes the conversion of pyruvate to lactate in the cytosol, oxidizing NADH to NAD^{+}. Lactate is then transported from the peripheral tissues to the liver. There it is reformed into pyruvate and ultimately to glucose, which can travel back to the peripheral tissues, completing the Cori cycle.

Thus, lactate has traditionally been considered a toxic metabolic byproduct that could give rise to fatigue and muscle pain during anaerobic respiration. Lactate can be thought of essentially as payment for "oxygen debt", defined by Hill and Lupton as the "total amount of oxygen used, after cessation of exercise in recovery there from".

== Clinical significance ==
Highly malignant tumors rely heavily on aerobic glycolysis (metabolism of glucose to lactic acid even under presence of oxygen; Warburg effect) and thus need to efflux lactic acid via MCTs to the tumor micro-environment to maintain a robust glycolytic flux and to prevent the tumor from being "pickled to death". The MCTs have been successfully targeted in pre-clinical studies using RNAi and a small-molecule inhibitor alpha-cyano-4-hydroxycinnamic acid (ACCA; CHC) to show that inhibiting lactic acid efflux is a very effective therapeutic strategy against highly glycolytic malignant tumors.

== See also ==
Monocarboxylate transporters:

- SLC16A1
- SLC16A2
- SLC16A3
- SLC16A4
- SLC16A5
- SLC16A6
- SLC16A7
- SLC16A8
- SLC16A9
- SLC16A10
- SLC16A11
- SLC16A12
- SLC16A13
- SLC16A14
