= Monocarboxylate transporter 4 =

Protein-coding gene in the species Homo sapiens

SLC16A3

Identifiers
- Aliases: SLC16A3, MCT 3, MCT 4, MCT-3, MCT-4, MCT3, MCT4, solute carrier family 16 member 3
- External IDs: OMIM: 603877; MGI: 1933438; GeneCards: SLC16A3

Gene location (Human)
Chr.	Chromosome 17 (human)
Band	17q25.3	Start	82,217,934 bp
Band	17q25.3	End	82,261,129 bp

Gene location (Mouse)
Chr.	Chromosome 11 (mouse)
Band	11|11 E2	Start	120,839,306 bp
Band	11|11 E2	End	120,851,694 bp
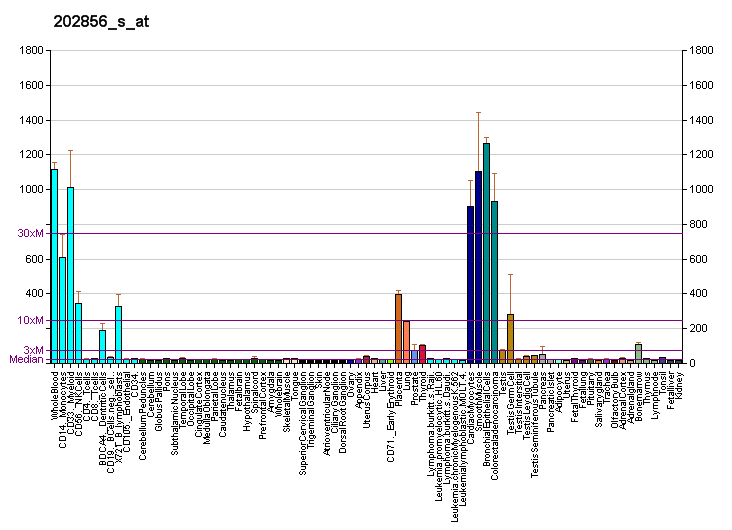

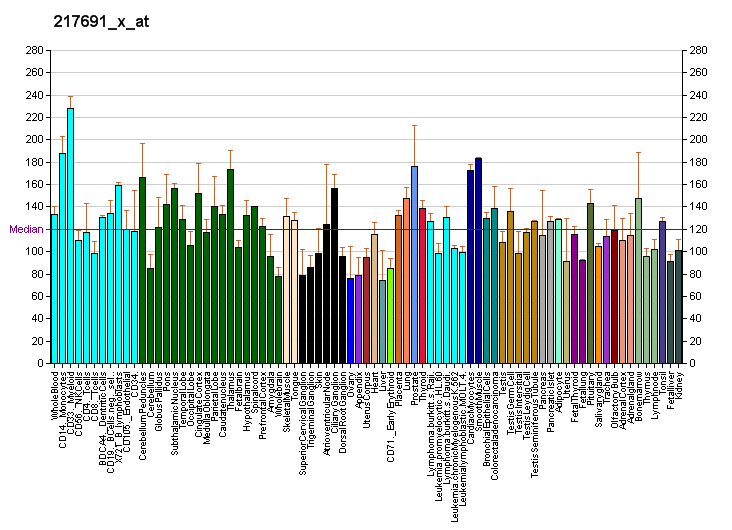

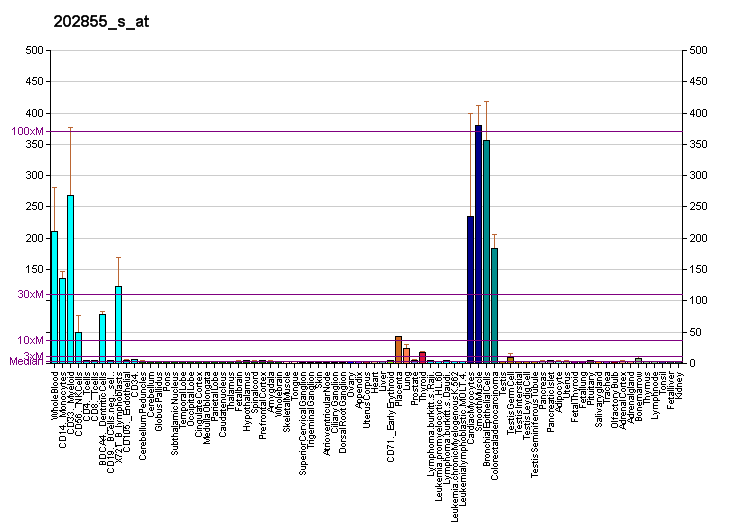
RNA expression pattern
Bgee	Human / Mouse (ortholog); Top expressed in: stromal cell of endometrium; monocyte; granulocyte; blood; nasal epithelium; gastrocnemius muscle; pericardium; mucosa of transverse colon; cartilage tissue; tendon of biceps brachii / Top expressed in: muscle of thigh; granulocyte; epiblast; triceps brachii muscle; embryo; medial head of gastrocnemius muscle; knee joint; embryo; ankle; skeletal muscle tissue; More reference expression data
BioGPS	More reference expression data
Gene ontology
Molecular function	protein binding; symporter activity; RNA binding; lactate transmembrane transporter activity; monocarboxylic acid transmembrane transporter activity
Cellular component	plasma membrane; integral component of plasma membrane; nuclear membrane; membrane; integral component of membrane; parallel fiber to Purkinje cell synapse; integral component of postsynaptic density membrane
Biological process	monocarboxylic acid transport; pyruvate metabolic process; leukocyte migration; transmembrane transport; plasma membrane lactate transport; transport; lactate transmembrane transport
Sources:Amigo / QuickGO
Orthologs
Databases	NCBI: entry; OMA: entry
Species	Human	Mouse
Entrez	9123	80879
Ensembl	ENSG00000141526	ENSMUSG00000025161
UniProt	O15427	P57787
RefSeq (mRNA)	NM_001042422; NM_001042423; NM_001206950; NM_001206951; NM_001206952 NM_004207	NM_001038653; NM_001038654; NM_030696
RefSeq (protein)	NP_001035887; NP_001035888; NP_001193879; NP_001193880; NP_001193881 NP_004198; NP_001035887.1; NP_001035888.1; NP_001193879.1; NP_001193880.1; NP_001193881.1; NP_004198.1	NP_001033742; NP_001033743; NP_109621
Location (UCSC)	Chr 17: 82.22 – 82.26 Mb	Chr 11: 120.84 – 120.85 Mb
PubMed search
- Wikidata
View/Edit Human	View/Edit Mouse

Monocarboxylate transporter 4 (MCT4) also known as solute carrier family 16 member 3 is a protein that in humans is encoded by the SLC16A3 gene.

Northern and western blotting and EST database analyses showed MCT4 to be widely expressed and especially so in glycolytic tissues such as white skeletal muscle fibers, astrocytes, white blood cells, chondrocytes, and some mammalian cell lines. Because of this, it has been proposed that the properties of MCT4 might be especially appropriate for export of lactate derived from glycolysis. MCT4 exhibits a lower affinity for most substrates and inhibitors than MCT1, with Km and Ki values some 5–10-fold higher. The high Km for pyruvate may be especially significant as this avoids loss of pyruvate from the cell which, were it to occur, would prevent removal of the reduced form of nicotinamide adenine dinucleotide (NADH) produced in glycolysis by reduction of pyruvate to lactate.

MCT4 in the brain is primarily expressed in astrocytes and microglia. Experimental studies show that astrocytes release lactate primarily via MCT4 during wakefulness, supporting orexin neuron firing and promoting wakefulness, highlighting a key role for astrocyte-derived lactate in sleep–wake regulation.

MCT4 can be upregulated by HIF-1α and AMPK.

== See also ==
- Monocarboxylate transporter
- Solute carrier family
