= DU145 =

Human prostate cancer cell line

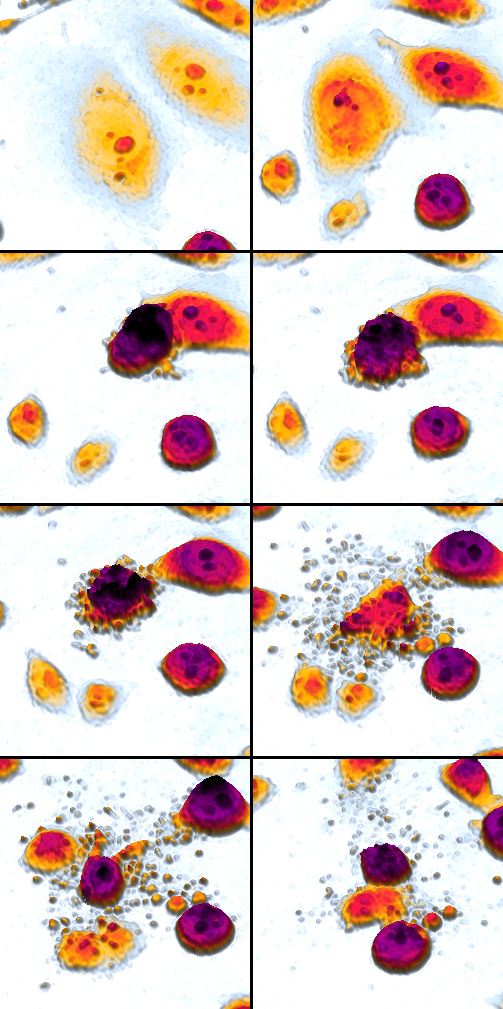
Apoptosis in DU145 prostate cancer cells, induced by etoposide.

DU145 (DU-145) is a human prostate cancer cell line. DU145, PC3, and LNCaP are considered to be the standard prostate cancer cell lines used in therapeutic research.

The DU145 cell line was derived from a central nervous system metastasis, of primary prostate adenocarcinoma origin, removed during a parieto-occipital craniotomy of a 69-year-old, white male. DU145 are not hormone-sensitive and do not express prostate-specific antigen (PSA). DU145 cells have moderate metastatic potential compared to PC3 cells, which have high metastatic potential.

== Research on castration-resistant prostate cancer ==
Castration-resistant prostate cancer (CRPC) is prostate cancer that progresses despite extremely low testosterone in the body often due to medical castration. Unlike many other types of prostate cancer, CRPC do not need normal testosterone levels, but they still require regular androgen receptors (AR).

=== Effects of NEK6 alteration ===
NEK6 inhibition is a potential treatment for CRPC due to its role as an essential protein kinase in the mitotic cell cycle. Although specific pathways remain unclear, deactivating the NEK6 gene is able to decrease clonogenic capacity, proliferation, cell viability, and mitochondrial activity. Additionally, intracellular ROS is increased and antioxidant defenses including SOD1, SOD2, and PRDX3 are decreased. SOD1, SOD2, and PRDX3 are known to be pro-oncogenic and be involved in chemotherapy resistance. Overall, altering NEK6 leads to DNA damage and death of DU-145 cells through changes in the redox balance and DNA damage response.

=== Effects of Xanthium fruit extracts ===
The compound 8-Epi-xanthatin (EXT) is an extract from Xanthium fruit and is used as a natural transcription 3 (STAT3) inhibitor to induce apoptotic cell death and decrease DU-145 cancer cell proliferation. DU-145 cells consistently express activated STAT3 and required STAT3 activity for proliferation and survival. However, EXT can be used as an anti-cancer therapeutic as the toxicity to normal cells (MCF10A and HFF) is lower than to DU-145. STAT3 regulates proliferation of cancer cells through target genes, including cyclin A, cyclin D1, and antiapoptotic proteins, such as BCL-2, and BCL-xL. After treatment of DU-145 with EXT, the aforementioned genes are strongly suppressed, ROS production increased, and cancer cell apoptosis was increased.
