= Monocarboxylate transporter 1 =

Protein found in humans

SLC16A1

Identifiers
- Aliases: SLC16A1, HHF7, MCT, MCT1, MCT1D, solute carrier family 16 member 1
- External IDs: OMIM: 600682; MGI: 106013; GeneCards: SLC16A1

Gene location (Human)
Chr.	Chromosome 1 (human)
Band	1p13.2	Start	112,911,847 bp
Band	1p13.2	End	112,957,593 bp

Gene location (Mouse)
Chr.	Chromosome 3 (mouse)
Band	3|3 F2.2	Start	104,545,984 bp
Band	3|3 F2.2	End	104,565,778 bp
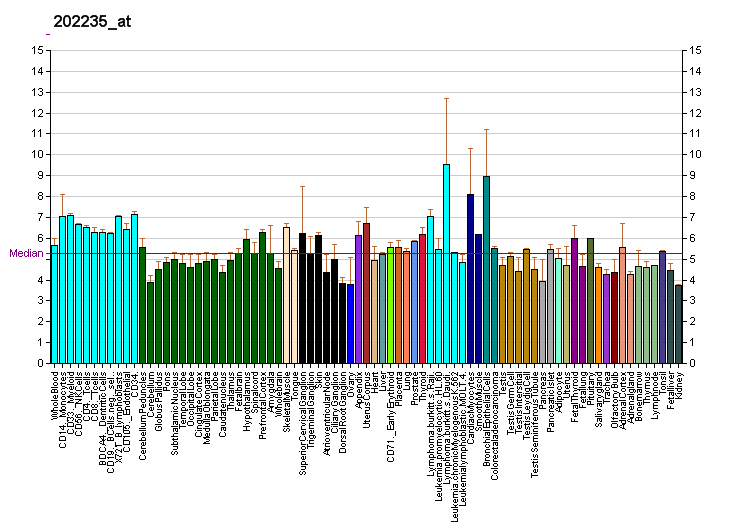

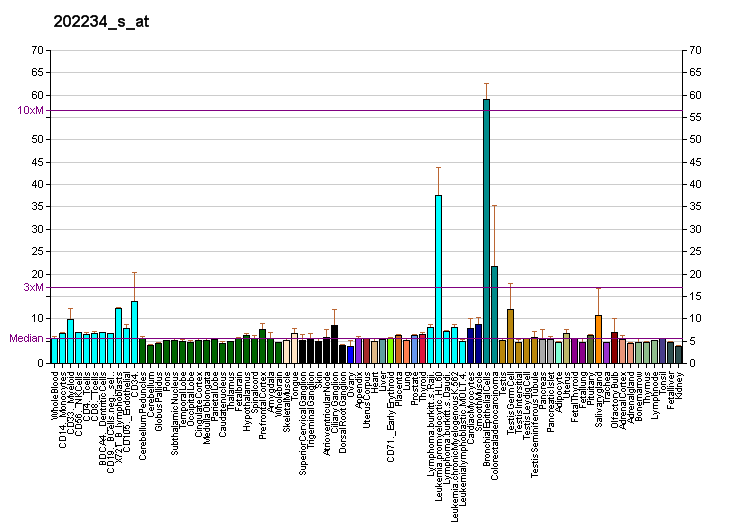

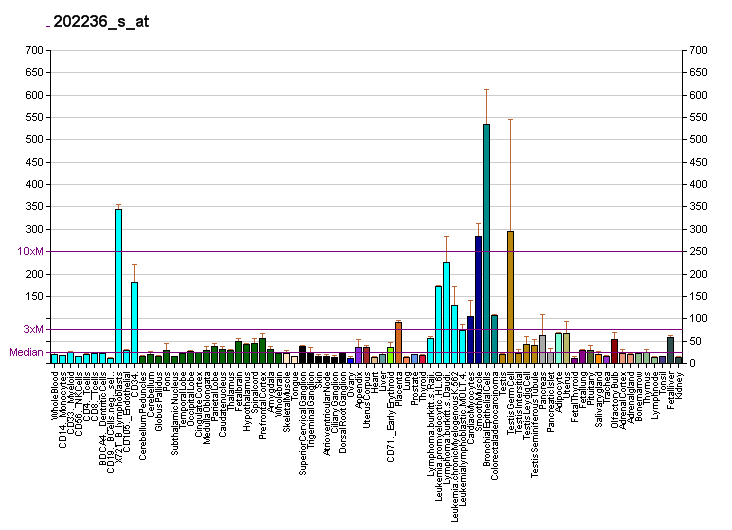
RNA expression pattern
Bgee	Human / Mouse (ortholog); Top expressed in: mucosa of transverse colon; ventricular zone; smooth muscle tissue; left ventricle; endometrium; rectum; placenta; duodenum; skeletal muscle tissue; right auricle of heart / Top expressed in: retinal pigment epithelium; optic nerve; primitive streak; left colon; atrioventricular valve; fetal liver hematopoietic progenitor cell; atrium; right ventricle; mucous cell of stomach; intercostal muscle; More reference expression data
BioGPS	More reference expression data
Gene ontology
Molecular function	protein homodimerization activity; monocarboxylic acid transmembrane transporter activity; mevalonate transmembrane transporter activity; organic cyclic compound binding; symporter activity; lactate transmembrane transporter activity
Cellular component	integral component of membrane; centrosome; membrane; plasma membrane; integral component of plasma membrane; mitochondrion; extracellular exosome; cell junction; intracellular membrane-bounded organelle; synapse
Biological process	monocarboxylic acid transport; glucose homeostasis; regulation of insulin secretion; lipid metabolism; behavioral response to nutrient; cellular response to organic cyclic compound; lactate transmembrane transport; pyruvate metabolic process; response to food; mevalonate transport; leukocyte migration; transmembrane transport; plasma membrane lactate transport; centrosome cycle; transport
Sources:Amigo / QuickGO
Orthologs
Databases	NCBI: entry; OMA: entry
Species	Human	Mouse
Entrez	6566	20501
Ensembl	ENSG00000155380; ENSG00000281917	ENSMUSG00000032902
UniProt	P53985; Q5T8R3	P53986
RefSeq (mRNA)	NM_001166496; NM_003051	NM_009196
RefSeq (protein)	NP_001159968; NP_003042	NP_033222
Location (UCSC)	Chr 1: 112.91 – 112.96 Mb	Chr 3: 104.55 – 104.57 Mb
PubMed search
- Wikidata
View/Edit Human	View/Edit Mouse

Monocarboxylate transporter 1 is a ubiquitous protein that in humans is encoded by the SLC16A1 gene (also known as MCT1). It is a proton coupled monocarboxylate transporter.

== Biochemistry ==
Detailed kinetic analysis of monocarboxylate transport in erythrocytes revealed that MCT1 operates through an ordered mechanism. MCT1 has a substrate binding site open to the extracellular matrix which binds a proton first followed by the lactate anion. The protein then undergoes a conformational change to a new closed conformation that exposes both the proton and lactate to the opposite surface of the membrane where they are released, lactate first and then the proton. For net transport of lactic acid, the rate-limiting step is the return of MCT1 without bound substrate to the open conformation. For this reason, exchange of one monocarboxylate inside the cell with another outside is considerably faster than net transport of a monocarboxylate across the membrane.

MCT1 can be upregulated by PPAR-α, Nrf2, and AMPK.

== Animal studies ==
Overexpression of MCT1 has been shown to increase the efficacy of an anti-cancer drug currently undergoing clinical trials called 3-bromopyruvate in breast cancer cells.

== Clinical significance ==
Most cases of alveolar soft part sarcoma show PAS(+), diastase-resistant (PAS-D (+)) intracytoplasmic crystals which contain CD147 and monocarboxylate transporter 1 (MCT1). Overexpression of MCT1 in pancreatic beta cells leads to hyperinsulinism during exercise.

Hyperinsulinemic hypoglycemia, familial, 7 (HHF7) is an autosomal dominant disease on the SLC16A1/MCT gene on chromosome 1p13.2. It causes hyperinsulinemic hypoglycemia, where hyperinsulinism is exercise-induced.

Monocarboxylate transporter 1 deficiency (MCTD1) is an autosomal dominant and recessive disease on the SLC16A1/MCT1 gene on chromosome 1p13.2. It causes poor feeding and vomiting, intellectual disability, ketotic hypoglycemia, ketoacidosis, ketonuria, with episodes brought on by fasting or infection.

Erythrocyte lactate transporter defect (formerly, myopathy due to lactate transport defect) is an autosomal dominant disease on the SLC16A1/MCT gene on chromosome 1p.13.2. It causes exercise-induced muscle cramping, stiffness, and fatigue (exercise intolerance); symptoms may also be induced by heat. Although symptoms present in the muscles, muscle biopsy and EMG are normal. Decreased erythrocyte (red blood cell) lactate clearance, decreased lactate clearance from muscle after exercise, and elevated serum creatine kinase.
