= U0126 =

Molecule

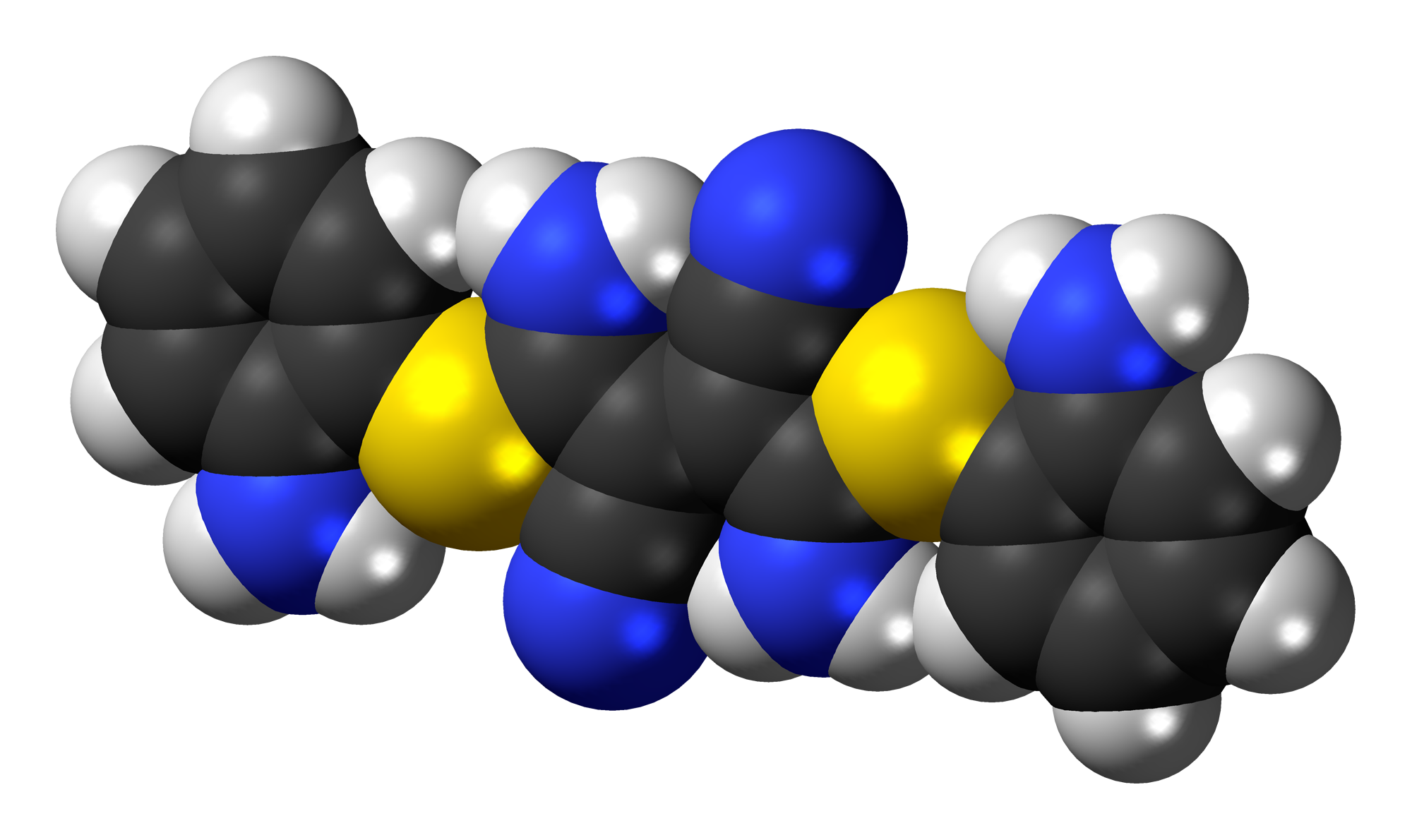

Identifiers
- IUPAC name: (2Z,3Z)-2,3-bis[amino-(2-aminophenyl)sulfanylmethylidene]butanedinitrile
- CAS Number: 218601-62-8
- PubChem CID: 3006531
- ChemSpider: 2276356
- UNII: 8027P94HLL
- ChEBI: CHEBI:90693
- ChEMBL: ChEMBL34704
- CompTox Dashboard (EPA): DTXSID10892034

Chemical and physical data
- Formula: C_{18}H_{16}N_{6}S_{2}
- Molar mass: 380.49 g·mol^{−1}
- 3D model (JSmol): Interactive image
- SMILES: c1cc(c(cc1)S/C(=C(/C(=C(/Sc2c(cccc2)N)\N)/C#N)\C#N)/N)N
- InChI: InChI=1S/C18H16N6S2/c19-9-11(17(23)25-15-7-3-1-5-13(15)21)12(10-20)18(24)26-16-8-4-2-6-14(16)22/h1-8H,21-24H2/b17-11+,18-12+; Key:DVEXZJFMOKTQEZ-JYFOCSDGSA-N

U0126 is a MEK1/2 inhibitor that is used to study MEK and related signaling pathways. This inhibitor is selective for both MEK1 and MEK2, two specific types of MEK (MAPK kinases) that are elements of the MAPK/ERK signaling pathway. This compound is usually studied in the context of cancer treatment, ischemia, and cellular oxidative stress.

The compound is not approved by the FDA as a therapeutic agent, and is primarily used in preclinical research settings. This compound is available for research purposes from a number of companies.

U0126 was found to functionally antagonize AP-1 transcriptional activity via noncompetitive inhibition of the dual specificity kinase MEK with IC_{50} of 72 nM for MEK1 and 58 nM for MEK2. U0126 inhibited anchorage-independent growth of Ki-ras-transformed rat fibroblasts by simultaneously blocking both extracellular signal-regulated kinase (ERK) and mammalian target of rapamycin (mTOR)-p70(S6K) pathways. U0126 is selective for MEK and has little to no effect on other signaling molecules such as PKC, Raf, ERK, JNK, MEKK, MKK-3, MKK-4/SEK, MKK-6, Cdk2 and Cdk4.

The effects of U0126 on the growth of eight human breast cancer cell lines shown that U0126 selectively repressed anchorage-independent growth of MDA-MB231 and HBC4 cells, two lines with constitutively activated ERK. Loss of contact with substratum triggers apoptosis in many normal cell types, a phenomenon termed anoikis. U0126 sensitized MDA-MB231 and HBC4 to anoikis, i.e., upon treatment with U0126, cells deprived of anchorage entered apoptosis.

Its potential for wiping long-term memories in rats has been studied at the Center for Neural Science at New York University.

== See also ==
- Xantocillin
