= List of breast cancer cell lines =

Scientists study the behaviour of isolated cells grown in the laboratory for insights into how cells function in the body in health and disease. Experiments using cell culture are used for developing new diagnostic tests and new treatments for diseases. This is a list of major breast cancer cell lines that are primarily used in breast cancer research. (Note: The original list was mainly based on the work of Lacroix and Leclercq (2004).)

== List of cell lines ==
Cell line	Primary tumor	Origin of cells	Estrogen receptors	Progesterone receptors	ERBB2 amplification	Mutated TP53 (Note: For more data on the nature of TP53 mutations in breast cancer cell lines, see Lacroix et al. (2006).)	Tumorigenic in mice	Metastasis potential	Reference	External links
600MPE	Invasive ductal carcinoma		+	–		–				Cellosaurus
AMJ13	Invasive ductal carcinoma	Primary	Yes	Yes	No	-	-			Cellosaurus
AU565	Adenocarcinoma		–	–	+	–				Cellosaurus
BT-20	Invasive ductal carcinoma	Primary	No	No	No	Yes	Yes			Cellosaurus
BT-474	Invasive ductal carcinoma	Primary	Yes	Yes	Yes	Yes	Yes			Cellosaurus
BT-483	Invasive ductal carcinoma		+	+		–				Cellosaurus
BT-549	Invasive ductal carcinoma		–	–		+				Cellosaurus
Evsa-T	Invasive ductal carcinoma, mucin-producing, signet-ring type	Metastasis (ascites)	No	Yes	?	Yes	?			Cellosaurus
HCC 1137										
HCC 1954										
HCC 38										
Hs578T	Invasive ductal carcinoma	Primary	No	No	No	Yes	No			Cellosaurus
HTB-26										
MCF-7	Invasive ductal carcinoma	Metastasis (pleural effusion)	Yes	Yes	No	No (wild-type)	Yes (with estrogen supplementation)			Cellosaurus
MDA-MB-231	Adenocarcinoma	Metastasis (pleural effusion)	No	No	No	Yes	Yes			Cellosaurus
SkBr3	Invasive ductal carcinoma	Metastasis (pleural effusion)	No	No	Yes	Yes	No			Cellosaurus
T-47D	Invasive ductal carcinoma	Metastasis (pleural effusion)	Yes	Yes	No	Yes	Yes (with estrogen supplementation)			Cellosaurus
UACC-3199										
ZR-75-1	Invasive ductal carcinoma									Cellosaurus
