= SKBR3 =

Human breast cancer cell line

SkBr3 (also known as SK-BR-3) is a human breast cancer cell line isolated by the Memorial Sloan–Kettering Cancer Center in 1970 that is used in therapeutic research, especially in context of HER2 targeting.

== History and characteristics ==
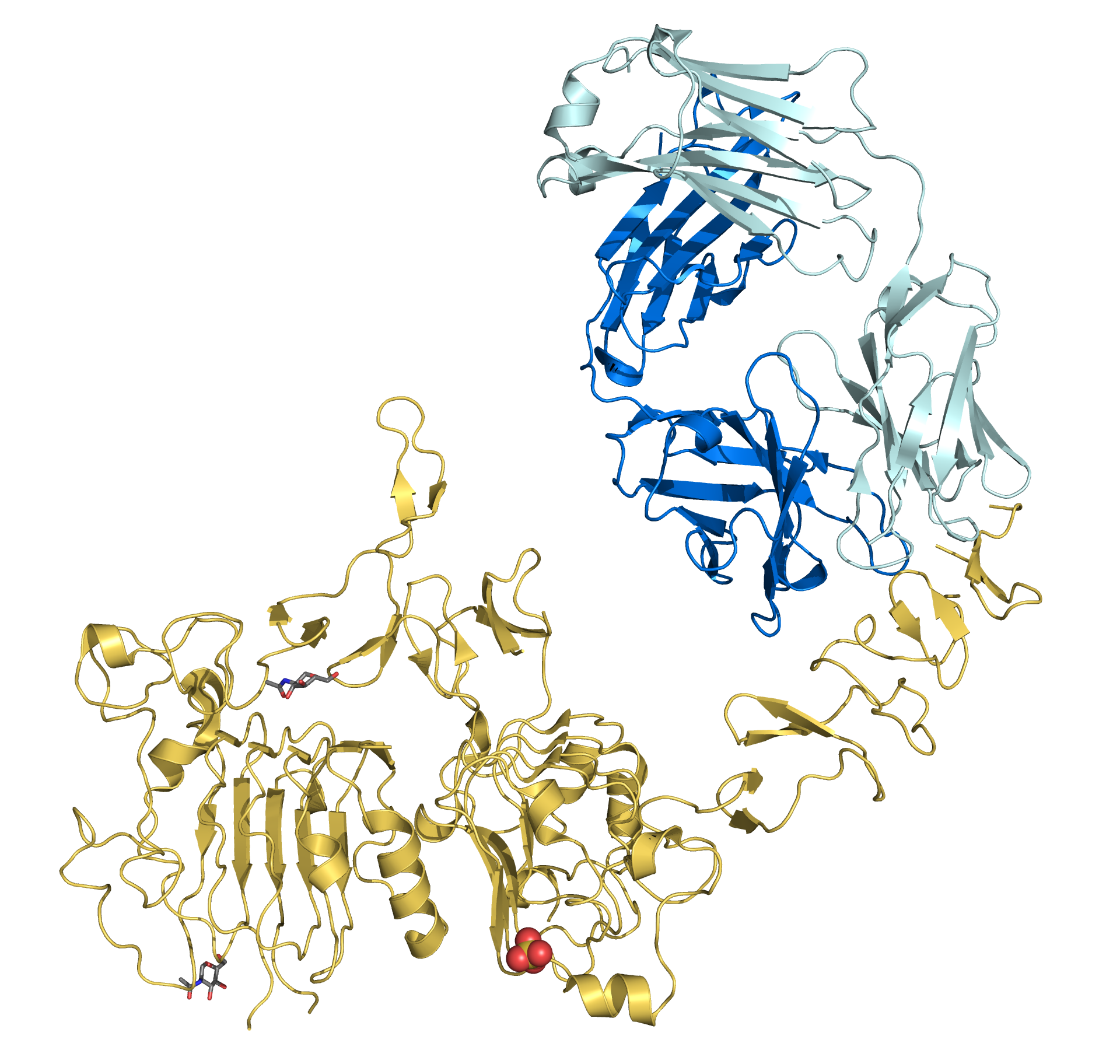
The HER2 gene product is over-expressed in SkBr3 cells

SkBr3 cells were derived from a pleural effusion due to an adenocarcinoma originating in a 43-year-old caucasian female. The cell line over-expresses the HER2 gene product, which has been implicated in several breast cancer proliferation pathways. The SkBr3 cell line is autologous (derived from the same patient) with the AU565 cell line. The cells are considered biosafety level 1. They are known to grow in grape-like clusters with an invasive phenotype resembling that of the cells in vivo.

== Research applications ==
SkBr3 cells have been used in studies seeking to overcome Herceptin treatment resistance to HER2-overexpressing breast cancers. The cell line has also been examined for applications in CRISPR/Cas9 gene editing, antibody resistance in transfections, and HER2-based cancer therapies in context of microenvironment fluctuations.

== See also ==
- List of breast cancer cell lines
