= Antibody-vaccine engineered construct =

Antibody-vaccine engineered construct abbreviated AVEC is an anti cancer drug in clinical trials that enables the immune system to detect and naturally eliminate malignant cells. It is a biomolecularly engineered molecule consisting of the two main components: (1) antibody; (2) vaccine. (1) The antibody component binds AVEC to the targeted molecule, e.g., to epidermal growth factor receptor 2 (HER2) on breast cancer cells. (2) The vaccine component elicits an immune response, directed against the cancer cells bound by the antibody component, e.g., immune response to the HBV vaccine mounted by the prophylactic immunity gained by vaccination. It has the potential to be used to treat a variety of types of cancer, including breast cancer, ovarian cancer, colorectal cancer and leukemias.

== Mechanism of action ==
The mechanism of action of AVEC relies upon the immunity acquired through vaccination or natural illness against microbials (e.g., viruses, bacteria, etc.) being redirected, amplified, and accelerated against the cancer cells. For example, a person vaccinated against hepatitis B virus, but suffering from HER2+ breast cancer receives AVEC, consisting of the antibody against HER2 and vaccine against HBV (AVEC: anti-HER2 - HBV). Since this persons immune system has already prepared a response to the HBV virus, it will instantly attack any cell tagged by it, in this case the breast cancer cells, overexpressing HER2. As such, AVEC attracts the components of the immune response like a lightning-rod attracts the thunderbolts during storms.

== Research ==
A 2016 compared AVECs ability to induce apoptosis and necrosis in HER2+ breast cancer compared to the commonly used drug trastuzumab. It found that the cells was treated with AVEC had a statistically significant higher amount of both apoptosis and necrosis. The percentage of necrotic cells due to treatment with AVEC more than tripled compared to necrotic cells due to treatment with trastuzumab.
