= MDA-MB231 =

Breast cancer cell line

MDA-MB-231 (M D Anderson - Metastatic Breast - 231) is a human breast cancer cell line isolated at MD Anderson Cancer Center in 1973 that is used in therapeutic research, especially in the context of triple negative breast cancer.

== History and characteristics ==
MDA-MB-231 cells were derived from a pleural effusion due to an adenocarcinoma originating in a 51-year-old caucasian female. The cell line is triple negative, meaning it lacks estrogen receptors, progesterone receptors, and HER2 (human epidermal growth factor receptor 2) amplification which many current treatment options rely on making it difficult to cure. In addition, this cell line has a low expression of the Ki-67 proliferation marker, down regulation of claudin-3 and claudin-4, enrichment for markers associated with the epithelial-mesenchymal transition and the CD44+CD24-/low phenotype associated with breast cancer stem cells and increased metastasis, and is a mutant in the p53 and KRas oncogenes. The cells are considered biosafety level 1. They can be grown in 2 or 3-D cultures.

MDA-MB-231 cells have an epithelial morphology with elongated and polygonal shapes. They are adherent and different clones show variation in cell shape.

== Research applications ==
MDA-MB-231 is used to study potential treatments for a cancer with currently limited treatment options by either improving current medication delivery and efficacy, or by trying new treatment courses.

This cell line has also been utilized to study metastasis to the bones and lungs.

== See also ==
- List of breast cancer cell lines
