= Jerome Urban =

American surgical oncologist (1914–1991)

Jerome Urban (1914–1991) was an American surgical oncologist who promoted superradical mastectomies until 1963, when the lack of difference in ten-year survival rates convinced him that it worked no better than the less-mutilating radical mastectomy.

== Education ==
Born in Brooklyn, he attended Andrew College and then Columbia University College of Physicians and Surgeons. He was a resident in the surgical oncology program of Memorial Sloan-Kettering under George T. Pack.
