= BT-20 =

Breast cancer cell line

BT-20 is a breast cancer cell line derived from a 74-year-old human female in 1958 by E.Y. Lasfargues and L. Ozzello. The cells technically came from a triple-negative breast cancer, which was caused by an invasive ductal carcinoma in the mammary gland. BT-20 cells are known to have amplified regions of chromosomes 6, 11, and 20, with most cells being hyperdiploid. The cells express an estrogen receptor with a deletion of exon 5, and are used in preclinical studies of breast cancer.
