= Richard Wiseman (surgeon) =

English surgeon

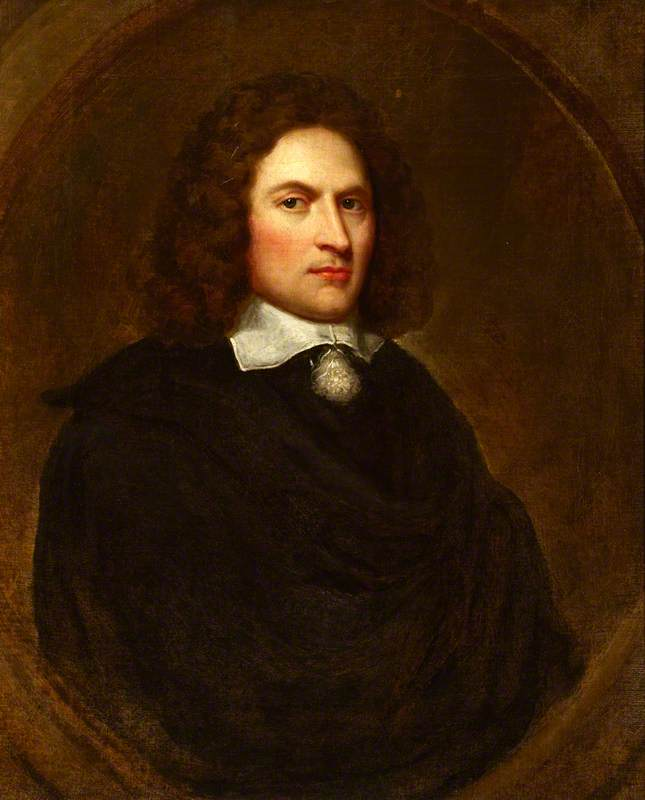
Richard Wiseman

Richard Wiseman (1622–1676) was an English surgeon, the first consultant surgeon in London. He was personal surgeon to King Charles II, and author of a medical work called Severall Chirurgical Treatises.

== Early life ==
Wiseman's parentage is uncertain. In early 1637, at age 16, he was apprenticed at the Barber-Surgeons' Hall to Richard Smith, surgeon, of Little Britain, London.

== Civil War years ==
Wiseman learned surgery on the battlefield. During the First English Civil War, he joined the royalist army of the west, then under the nominal command of the Prince of Wales. He was present at the first battle of Weymouth on 9 February 1645. He remained in Weymouth during the siege, and subsequently seems to have accompanied the royalist forces into Somerset and Cornwall; he was present at the siege at Taunton, and took part in the fighting of Truro.

The royalist army was then under the command of Ralph Hopton, 1st Baron Hopton. After the defeat at Truro, on his own account, Wiseman was the only surgeon who continuously attended Charles, the Prince of Wales, from the west of England to France, Holland, and Scotland, in the years 1646–1650. He was at first attached to the troops in attendance on the prince, but when Surgeon Richard Pile (Pyle) returned to England he became the prince's immediate medical attendant.

Wiseman accompanied Prince Charles from Jersey to France, and from France to The Hague, where news arrived in February 1649 of the execution of Charles I. From The Hague Wiseman accompanied Charles II to Breda, Flanders and back to France, arriving at St. Germains in August 1649. He then went to Jersey again, and when Charles left Holland in June 1650 Wiseman accompanied him to Scotland. He was taken prisoner at the battle of Worcester (3 September 1651) and marched to Chester, where he was kept in captivity.

Having procured a pass, Wiseman arrived in London about February 1652, and was admitted to the Company of Barbers and Surgeons of London, 23 March 1652. He acted for a time as assistant to Edward Molines of St. Thomas's Hospital. Then he set up in practice for himself, living in the Old Bailey at the sign of the King's Head, where he had royalist patients. Early in 1654 he was rearrested on a charge of assisting Read, a patient, to escape from the Tower of London, and in March 1654 he was sent a prisoner to Lambeth House. It appears that he owed his liberty to friends.

Wiseman wrote that he served for three years in the Spanish navy, and from the evidence it has been deduced that this period was from 1654 to 1657. He was in Dunkirk, then a Spanish possession, and the Caribbean.

== Later life, death and legacy ==
Early in 1660 Wiseman returned to his house in the Old Bailey, where he was living at the time of the English Restoration; but shortly after the Restoration he moved westward to Covent Garden. Ten days after the arrival of Charles II in London, on 8 June 1660, Wiseman was made royal surgeon in ordinary. On 5 August 1661 that Wiseman, already on a pension, was formally appointed and salaried as surgeon by royal warrant. He was promoted to the grade of principal surgeon and serjeant-surgeon to the king in 1672. He was elected a member of the Barber-Surgeons' court of assistants in 1664, and in the following year was appointed Master of the company.

Wiseman died suddenly at Bath, Somerset around 20 August 1676. He was buried at the upper end of St Paul's, Covent Garden on 29 August. He believed in the royal touch for the cure of scrofula, and in the miracles wrought by the blood of Charles I.

Wiseman was the first of the major British surgeons who elevated the surgical profession. His work was continued by Samuel Sharp, Percivall Pott, and John Hunter. He was essentially a clinical observer; his cases are clearly described, and their treatment is carried out on a plan. His Treatises cover 600 cases, with a broad background (though lithotomy does not appear), and were influential.

== Works ==
Wiseman's works are written in a plain and simple style; they were used by Samuel Johnson, in the compilation of his dictionary, as a mine of surgical nomenclature. They were:

- A Treatise of Wounds, London, 1672, printed by Richard Royston.
- Severall Chirurgical Treatises, London, 1676, (Royston and Took); 2nd edit. 1686; 3rd edit. 1696; 4th edit. 1705; 5th edit. 1719; 6th edit. 1734. A pirated edition was published by Samuel Clement at the Swan in St. Paul's Churchyard in 1692. It is called the second edition, but it seems to have been made by printing a new title-page and inserting it into copies of the 1676 and 1686 editions. The work describes over 600 of Wiseman's own cases. In the assessment of biographer G. Hull, "It is a more detailed and personal account than any written by his contemporaries, and his sections on the King's Evil and cancer show a remarkable understanding of disease for his time."

== Family ==
Wiseman's first wife, named Dorothy, died on 23 February 1674, and was buried in the chancel of St. Paul's Church, Covent Garden; his second wife was Mary, daughter of Sir Richard Mauleverer of Allerton Mauleverer in Yorkshire, and granddaughter of Sir Thomas Mauleverer the regicide. His only child was a posthumous son, who was buried near his father in November 1678. His widow married Thomas Harrison of Gray's Inn, the lawyer who settled her husband's affairs, and died in February 1678.
