= International Society for Computational Biology Student Council =

Student section of the International Society for Computational Biology

International Society for Computational Biology — Student Council
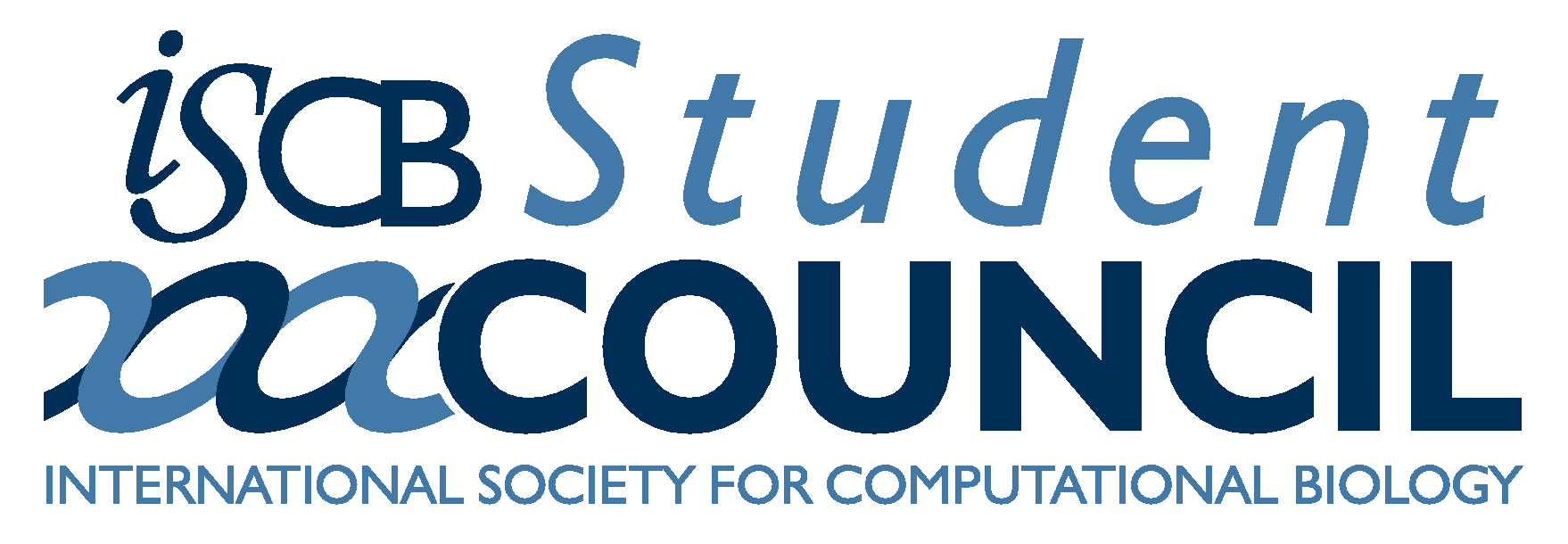
- Abbreviation: ISCB-SC
- Formation: 2004
- Founder: Manuel Corpas
- Type: Learned society
- Headquarters: Worldwide
- Executive Team: Pradeep Eranti (Chair); Ana Castillo (Vice Chair); Wim Cuypers (Secretary); Sanjana Fatema Chowdhury (Treasurer); Adrian Garcia Moreno (RSG Chair); Gabriel J. Olguín-Orellana (ISCB Board of Directors Representative)
- Parent organization: ISCB
- Website: www.iscbsc.org

The International Society for Computational Biology Student Council (ISCB-SC) is a dedicated section of the International Society for Computational Biology created in 2004. It is composed by students and young researchers from all levels (undergraduates, postgraduates, and postdoctoral researchers) in the fields of bioinformatics and computational biology. The organisation promotes the development of the students' community worldwide by organizing different events including symposia, workshops, webinars, internship coordination and hackathons. A special focus is made on the development of soft skills in order to develop potential in bioinformatics and computational biology students around the world.

The ISCB-SC is composed of Regional Student Groups (RSGs) which are located in various regions across the globe. Since its foundation, the ISCB-SC has gained representation in most continents through over thirty RSGs which collectively represent more than 1,000 students and researchers around the world.

== History ==
The ISCB Student Council was officially established in 2004 by a vote from the ISCB Board of Directors at the ISMB/ECCB meeting. The concept of the student council was first proposed by Manuel Corpas in late 2003. The establishment of the student council was the first move of the ISCB to include the new generation of computational biologists into the then newly emerging field.

The first meeting had about 30 students and eight members of the ISCB leadership at the Intelligent Systems for Molecular Biology (ISMB) 2005 in Detroit, Michigan The first official Student Council Symposium (SCS) was held later that year at the European Conference on Computational Biology (ECCB) meeting in Madrid, Spain. The first SCS had approximately 100 attendees and was the beginning of a long-running series of meetings organized and highlighting students. Other than the first instance of SCS, all later editions have as a satellite meeting of ISMB. In 2012, the SC started a second set of symposia that takes place at ECCB when it is not co-located with ISMB; the European Student Council Symposium (ESCS) regularly has more attendees than SCS when both events are held in the same year. Recently, the SC symposia have also been held along with other ISCB conferences, like in the case for the Latin American Student Council Symposium (LA-SCS) which is held every two years along with the Latin American ISCB Conference since 2014, or the ISCB Student Council Symposium in Africa (SCS-Africa) which is held along the ISCB Africa ASBCB conference since 2015.

== Regional Student Groups ==
In 2006, the student council created the Regional Student Group (RSG) initiative to tailor the efforts of the council for the local community. RSGs are locally managed groups established at various regions. Each RSG operates either under the aegis of a higher education institution or as an independent organisation sub-affiliated to local computational biology or bioinformatics organisation. RSGs are provided support from both the student council and other local groups in their region and often organize multi-RSG events such as BeNeLuxFra. As of 2017, the global network of the student council includes over 25 active RSGs operating across five continents.

The RSG committee was set up in 2008 to oversee and coordinates the activities of RSGs across the world. The team comprises an RSG-Chair, a co-chair and five vice-chairs corresponding to geographical regions (Asia-Pacific, Europe, Africa, Latin America and USA-Canada). The RSG chair is required to have previous experience as a president or secretary of an RSG. Currently, around 2,000 students and researchers are active members of RSG-related events.

The ISCB-SC continuously looks for PhD students or postdocs who may be interested in starting a new RSG in a region where the student council has no presence yet. The student council also supports existing RSGs by advising them on how to grow, in terms of the events and projects they face as well as economically. There are 3 funding calls every year where RSGs can submit proposals containing different types of events which will be evaluated by the continental RSG chairs and the Executive Committee. Since the creation of the Student Council F1000Research channel in 2016, achievements by RSGs throughout each year are discussed in editorial articles.

The ISCB-SC runs an internship program in which researchers throughout the world can offer a place for a student from a developing nation to join his/her group for a period of time. This program aims to give students from developing nations the opportunity to have an experience in a working environment from first class research groups and interact with expert Principal Investigators around the world.

== Press ==
As a worldwide organization, the SC organizes symposia, workshops and different events across the globe. After more than ten years of existence, many new experiences have been gained on how to deal with different obstacles that arise when trying to tackle complex objectives. Learning experiences are published as articles that aim to help new RSGs, as well as other student organizations, including bioinformatics communities, to organize their own events and strengthen their growth.

=== Publications about the Student Council ===
The Student Council is well recognized by members of the scientific community and its members are also recognized as outstanding members of their community

The Student Council also assists in efforts to improve the quality of public reference material, notably to the ISCB Wikipedia Competition.

Finally, highlights from all major symposia from both the Student Council and from the Regional Student Groups have been periodically published over the years (2007, 2008, 2009, 2010, 2011, 2012, 2014, 2015, 2016 and 2017 ).

=== Student Council Outreach Publications ===
Since its conception, the ISCB Student Council has not only advocated for the students in the ISCB and beyond but, also, the SC has made much effort to educate new students.

In 2014, the ISCB Student Council began publishing a collection of articles in the PLOS journals that covers details about the development of the SC and how to advance in the field. As a collective effort because of reaching a decade of story, different Student Council leaders from different regions in the world came together and published 12 articles as part of the "Stories from the road: ISCB Student Council Collection" that summarize the experience and lessons that were learned through those years. These articles range in topic from starting and expanding your scientific network, dealing with the frustration of failure, to disseminating science to the public. In particular, the article "Explain Bioinformatics to Your Grandmother!" that aims to simplify the answer to the question "What is bioinformatics?" to non-scientists, has accumulated more than 17,000 views (as of 2017) and constitutes one of the most read articles in PLOS Computational Biology.

The Student Council also has its own article channel on F1000Research which features publications highlighting the activities of the council.

In addition to the collections in F1000 and PLOS, the Student Council has publications that have appeared in BMC Bioinformatics and other journals.

== Events ==
The student council organizes several symposia each year to coincide with the major ISCB Conferences

- The Student Council Symposium (SCS) is held each year directly preceding ISMB (or ISMB/ECCB). The symposium has been organised each year since 2005.
- The European Student Council Symposium (ESCS) is a biennial symposium that takes place preceding the ECCB (when ECCB is not co-located with ISMB). It has been held since 2010.
- The Latin American Student Council Symposium (LA-SCS) is held in even-numbered years directly preceding ISCB-LA. The LA-SCS has been held every other year since 2014.
- The African Student Council Symposium (SCS Africa) is held preceding the ISCB Africa ASBCB Conference on Bioinformatics since 2015.
- The Asian Student Council Symposium (ASCS) is held preceding the ISCB-Asia Conference since 2022.

In addition to the main ISCB-SC events that accompany the main ISCB conference(s), RSGs also hold events on a regular basis; these include annual events in Argentina, Germany and the UK.

== Committees ==
Every year, ISCB and SC members elect new leadership positions. The positions are filled by students and/or postdoctoral members of the SC. The key mission of the SC's Executive Team is to lead the sustainable development of the organisation and its RSGs, and managing the coordination of all activities.

In addition, the SC aims to coordinate and integrate efforts of all members and volunteers who contribute their time. For the purpose of better organizational structure, the SC has established several committees that are chaired by SC members and managed by the executive team. Below is the list of the SC's committee's with description of each committee's responsibilities:

Committee name	Committee description	Chair/co-chair
Membership & Outreach	Our Membership and Outreach Committee is mainly responsible for recruitment and welcoming of new members, SC's online presence including social media management, and promotion of SC and RSG events.	Ana Castillo, Nikita Ray
Education & Internships	The core responsibility of Education and Internship committee is to promote educational initiatives among SC and RSG members. The committee aims to provide a forum where students and researchers will be able to freely voice their opinions on current education issues in fields computational biology, bioinformatics, and related fields. In addition, the committee is responsible for education initiatives such as the SC's internship program and organization of career-related events at our main events.	Pradeep Eranti
Finance	The committee is responsible for maintaining a comprehensive and realistic budget for the activities carried out by the student council. This includes SC's main events, funding opportunities for RSGs, and general operations. The committee also maintains a synergistic relationship with the SC's recurrent sponsors, to keep them interested.	Sanjana Fatema Chowdhury
Web	The committee is responsible for the web presence of the council which includes symposium websites. It also develops and maintains the online infrastructure for the SC.	Blessy Antony
RSG	This committee is responsible for the coordination of activities of local Regional Student Groups (RSGs) around the world.	Adrian Garcia Moreno
