= Gary Stormo =

American geneticist (born 1950)

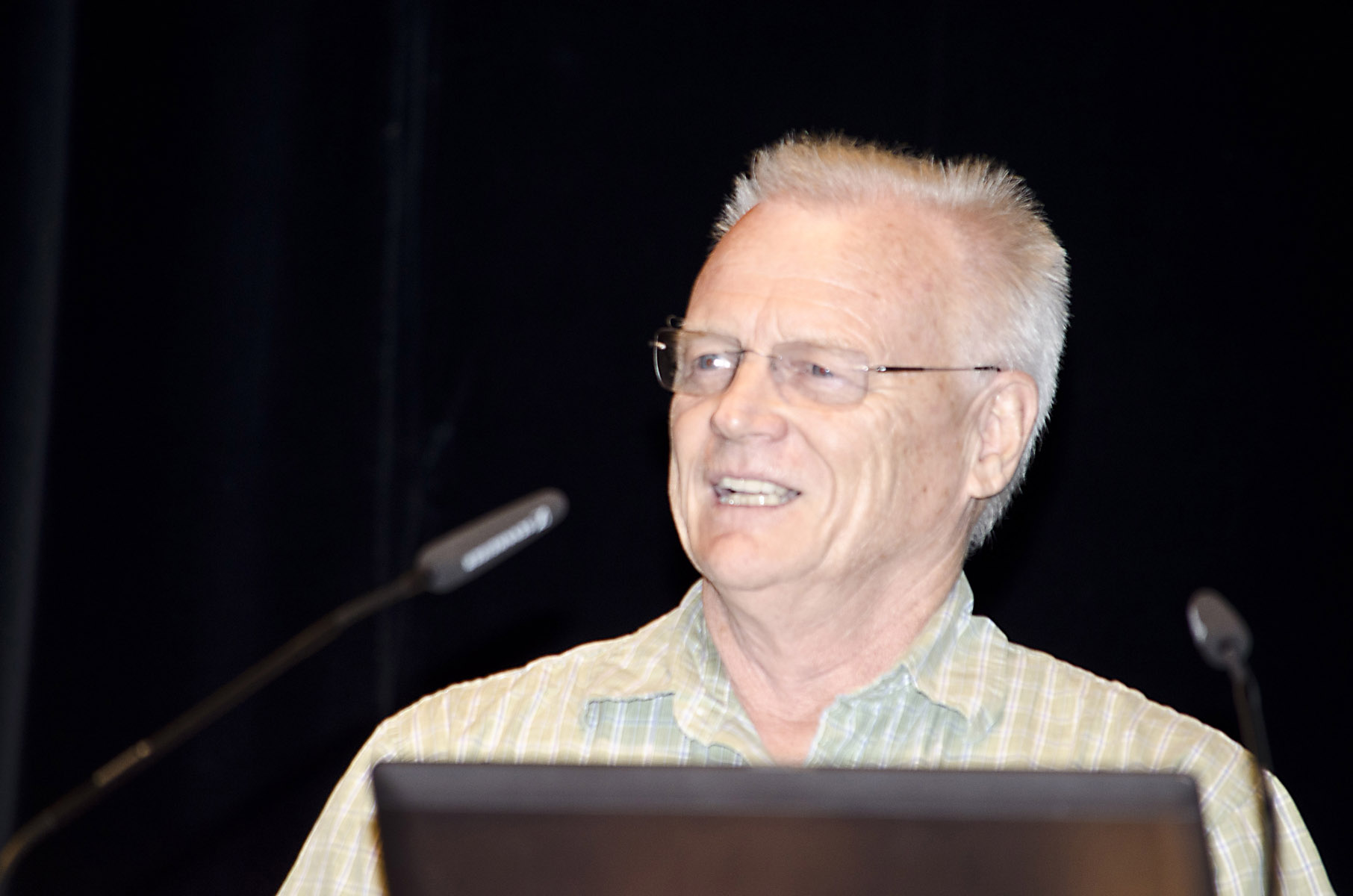
- Gary Stormo speaking at ISMB/ECCB 2013.
- Born: Gary Dean Stormo; 1950 (age 75–76); South Dakota, USA
- Education: California Institute of Technology; University of Colorado Boulder
- Scientific career
- Fields: Bioinformatics; Genetics; Molecular biology
- Workplaces: University of Colorado Boulder; Washington University in St. Louis
- Thesis: Computer-aided characterization of translational initiation sites in E. coli (1981)

Gary Stormo (born 1950) is an American geneticist and currently Joseph Erlanger Professor in the Department of Genetics and the Center for Genome Sciences and Systems Biology at Washington University School of Medicine. He is considered one of the pioneers of bioinformatics and genomics. His research combines experimental and computational approaches in order to identify and predict regulatory sequences in DNA and RNA, and their contributions to the regulatory networks that control gene expression.

== Education ==
Stormo initially majored in physics as an undergraduate at the California Institute of Technology, but switched to biology in his junior year. He received his PhD in molecular biology in 1981 from the University of Colorado at Boulder.

== Research ==
Following his PhD, Stormo stayed at the University of Colorado as a faculty member in the department of Molecular, Cellular and Developmental Biology, becoming a professor before moving to Washington University in St. Louis in 1999.

Stormo's research combines experimental and computational approaches to understand regulation of gene expression. His experimental work focuses on protein–DNA interactions and their role in gene regulation. His computational work involves analysis of these interactions and developing pattern recognition algorithms to discover regulatory sites in DNA and RNA.

In 1982, Stormo and his colleagues introduced the Position weight matrix (PWM), a now commonly used representation of motifs (patterns) in biological sequences. Consensus sequence had previously been used to represent patterns in biological sequences, but had difficulties in the prediction of new occurrences of these patterns. The first use of PWMs was in the discovery of RNA sites that function as translation initiation sites. The advantages of PWMs over consensus sequences have made PWMs a popular method for representing patterns in biological sequences and an essential component in modern algorithms for motif discovery.

He has published over 150 scientific papers.

== Roles and honours ==
Stormo served on the board of directors of the International Society for Computational Biology (ISCB) from 2000 to 2004 and was honoured as an ISCB Fellow in 2010. He was elected as a fellow of the American Medical Informatics Association in 2001.

Stormo was Executive Editor of the journal Bioinformatics from 1994 to 1999. In 2014, he was appointed one of the first Honorary Editors of Bioinformatics. Stormo has also served as Deputy Editor-in-Chief of the journal PLOS Computational Biology. He is currently co-editor of the journal Current Protocols in Bioinformatics.
