= INB (disambiguation) =

INB may refer to:

- INB, a locally owned, privately held national bank based in Springfield, Illinois
- INB Financial Corporation, an Indianapolis-based statewide bank
- Instituto Nacional de Bioinformática, the Spanish National Bioinformatics Institute
- Independence Airport (Belize), the IATA code INB
- Inter National Bank, a U.S. bank headquartered in McAllen, Texas
- Intergovernmental negotiating body, established by the World Health Organization for an International Treaty on Pandemic Prevention, Preparedness and Response (working title)
- inb, the ISO 639-3 code for Inga Kichwa
