= Michael Gribskov =

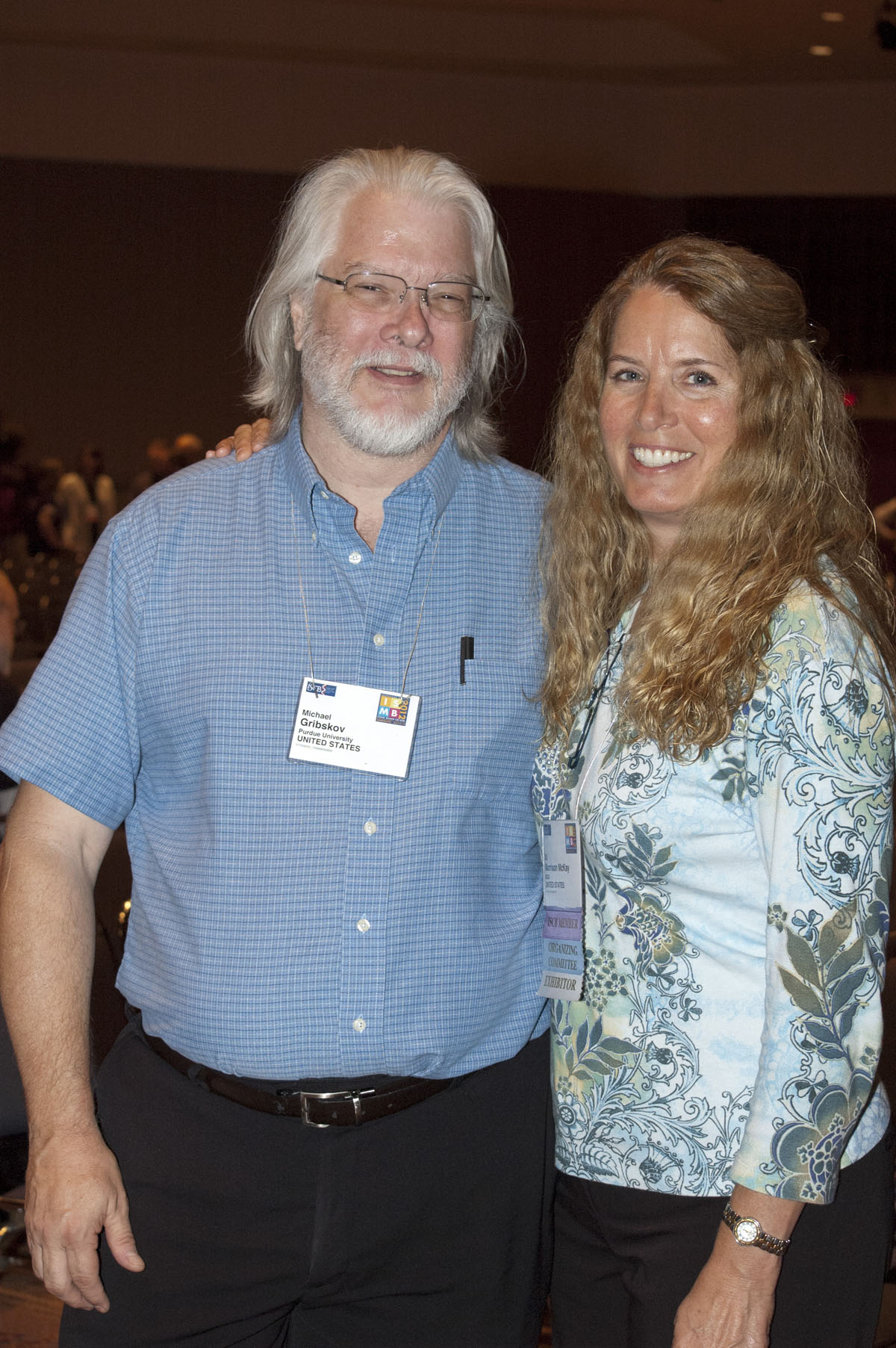
Michael Gribskov (left) at the ISMB conference in 2012.

Michael Gribskov is a professor of Biological Sciences and Computer Science at Purdue University. In 1979, Gribskov graduated from Oregon State University, with a Bachelor in Science Honors degree in Biochemistry and Biophysics. Later in 1985, he finished his PhD degree in Molecular Biology from University of Wisconsin–Madison.

He has served as president of the International Society for Computational Biology, and his faculty page states that he is the chair of the Protein Information Resource Scientific Oversight and Advisory Board, and on the editorial boards of the journals Bioinformatics, Journal of Computational Biology and Chemistry, and Journal of Molecular Microbiology & Biotechnology.

Year	Position
1979	B.S. with Honors in Biochemistry and Biophysics Oregon State University
1979–1984	NIH predoctoral training grant University of Wisconsin-Madison
1985	Ph.D. in Molecular Biology University of Wisconsin-Madison
1985–1987	American Cancer Society post-doctoral fellowship University of California - Los Angeles
1988–1992	Scientist Associate National Cancer Institute—FCRDC
1992	Staff Scientist San Diego Supercomputer Center
1993–1996	Senior Staff Scientist San Diego Supercomputer Center
1993–1999	Adjunct Assistant Professor of Biology University of California, San Diego
1994–1997	Principal Investigator Structural Queries on Nucleic Acid Databases
1999–2003	Adjunct Associate Professor of Biology University of California, San Diego
2004–present	Professor of Biological Science and Computer Science Purdue University

== Profile analysis ==
Gribskov, along with David Eisenberg and Andrew McLachlan, introduced the profile analysis method in 1987; this is a method for detecting distantly related proteins by sequence comparison. A profile is a position specific scoring matrix, and it is created from a group of sequences previously aligned (probe). The similarity of any other sequence (target) (one or more than one) to the probe can be tested by comparing the target to the file using dynamic programming. This algorithm consists of two steps. The first step is the generation of the profile using software PROFWARE, which makes use of an existing alignment (probe) based on sequence similarity or the corresponding 3D structure to generate a profile. The second step is the comparison of the profile with a database of sequences or a single sequence. In this step, based on the profile generated, the target sequence or group of sequences could be aligned using PROFINAL, dynamic programming is used in the alignment.

Preceded by Philip Bourne	President of the International Society for Computational Biology; 2003 – 2007	Succeeded by Burkhard Rost
