= Alfonso Valencia =

Spanish biologist

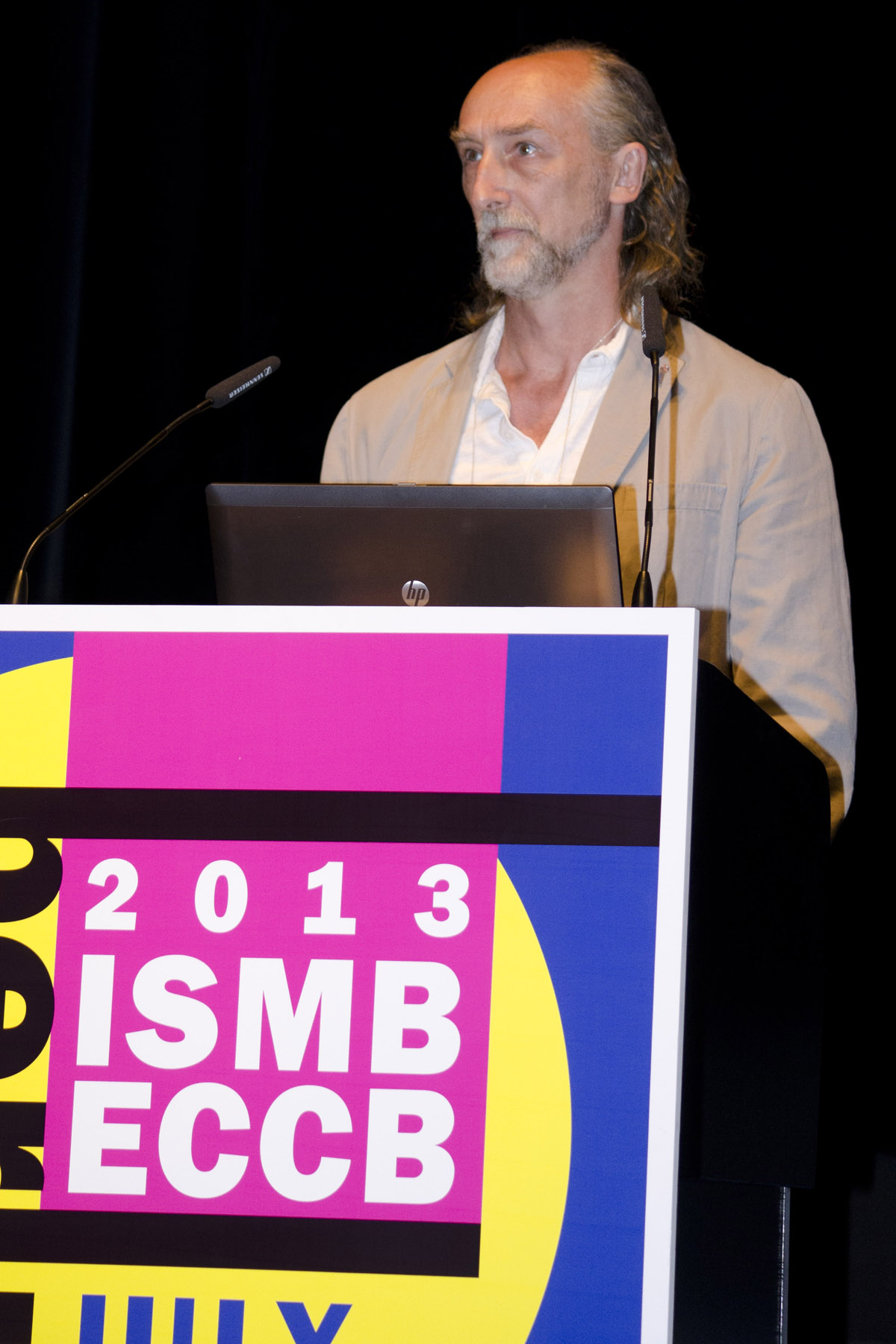
- Alfonso Valencia speaking at ISMB/ECCB 2013.
- Education: Complutense University of Madrid; Autonomous University of Madrid (PhD)
- Known for: BioCreative
- Awards: EMBO member; ISCB Fellow (2010)
- Scientific career
- Fields: Computational biology; Bioinformatics; Cancer genomics; Text mining; Protein evolution
- Workplaces: Spanish National Bioinformatics Institute; Spanish National Center for Biotechnology (CNB); European Molecular Biology Laboratory (EMBL); Spanish National Cancer Research Centre; Barcelona Supercomputing Center
- Academic advisors: Chris Sander

Alfonso Valencia is a Spanish biologist, ICREA Professor, current director of the Life Sciences department at Barcelona Supercomputing Center, of Spanish National Bioinformatics Institute (INB-ISCIII), and coordinator of the data pillar of the Spanish Personalised Medicine initiative, IMPaCT. From 2015 to 2018, he was President of the International Society for Computational Biology.

His research interest is the development of Computational Biology methods and their application to biomedical problems. Some of the computational methods he developed are considered pioneering work in areas such as biological text mining, protein coevolution, disease networks and more recently modelling cellular systems (digital twins). He participates in some of the key cancer related international consortia. In terms of community services, he is one of the initial promoters of the ELIXIR infrastructure, founder of the Spanish and International Bioinformatics networks and former president of ISCB, the international professional association of Bioinformaticians. He is Executive Editor of the main journal in the field (Bioinformatics OUP).

His research is focused on the study of biomedical systems with computational biology and bioinformatics approaches.

== Education ==
Valencia studied biology at the Complutense University of Madrid, training in population genetics and biophysics. In 1987 he was a visiting scientist at the American Red Cross Laboratory. He received his PhD in molecular biology in 1988 from the Autonomous University of Madrid. From 1989 to 1994 he was a Postdoctoral Fellow in the laboratory of Chris Sander at the European Molecular Biology Laboratory (EMBL) in Heidelberg, studying the evolution of protein function using sequence- and structure-based approaches.

The 1994 paper "Correlated mutations and residue contacts in proteins", of which Valencia was senior author, established the idea that correlated mutations at corresponding locations in the DNA sequences in different organisms could indicate that those locations corresponded to amino-acid residues that were physically close to each other in the final protein, informing the prediction of contact maps. This previously unconsidered source of side information for protein structure prediction became used with increasing effectiveness in the 2010s, leading ultimately to the success of DeepMind's AlphaFold 2 algorithm in 2020.

== Research ==
In 1994 Valencia formed the Protein Design Group at the Spanish National Center for Biotechnology (CNB). He was leader of the Structural and Computational Biology Group at CNIO. In 2006 he moved to the Spanish National Cancer Research Center (CNIO) as Director of the Structural Biology and Biocomputing programme.

Since 2016 he is ICREA Professor and Director of the Life Sciences Department of the Barcelona Supercomputing Centre (BSC).

As computational biologist, the focus of his work is the mechanistic understanding of biological systems, including cancer and other diseases, with a combination of Bioinformatics, Network Biology and Machine Learning approaches. His group has developed systems in the areas of protein structure prediction, protein interactions and protein networks, systems biology, text and data mining, with applications in epigenetic, cancer genomics and disease comorbidity. All these actives converge into the general topic of Personalised Medicine, with particular interest in the interface with Artificial intelligence and High Performance Computing.

As of 2024, Valencia has published over 450 peer reviewed papers, which have been cited more than 92.000 times, in scientific journals including Nature, PNAS, Nucleic Acids Research, the Journal of Molecular Biology, Bioinformatics, Genome Biology, PLOS Computational Biology, PLOS Biology, Nature Genetics, Nature Biotechnology, Genome Research, Biochemistry, Current Opinion in Structural Biology, Nature Structural Biology, Trends in Genetics and the Intelligent Systems for Molecular Biology conference.

== Awards and honours ==
Valencia has been nominated Corresponding Member of the Academy of Medicine of Zaragoza, Spain, in 2024. He was also appointed Research Professor at the CNB in 2005. He was a founding member of the International Society for Computational Biology (ISCB) and was honoured as an ISCB Fellow in 2010. Valencia has also served as ISCB Vice President and in 2013 was appointed President-elect. From 2015 to 2018, he was President of the ISCB, succeeding Burkhard Rost. Valencia is Doctor Honoris cause of the Danish DTU and elected member of the European Molecular Biology Organization (EMBO).

Valencia participates in several international consortia, such as Genecode / ENCODE, the International Cancer Genome Consortium, the International Rare Diseases Research Consortium (IRDiRC), the International Human Epigenomics Consortium. Valencia is Director of the Spanish National Bioinformatics Institute a platform of the ISCIII, the Spanish node of the European Life-sciences Infrastructure for Biological Information (ELIXIR).

He is currently co-executive editor of the journal Bioinformatics, and member of the Editorial boards of eLIFE, FEBS Letters, PeerJ and F1000 Prime.

Preceded by Burkhard Rost	President of the International Society for Computational Biology; 2015 – 2018	Succeeded by Thomas Lengauer
