= Burkhard Rost =

German computational biology researcher

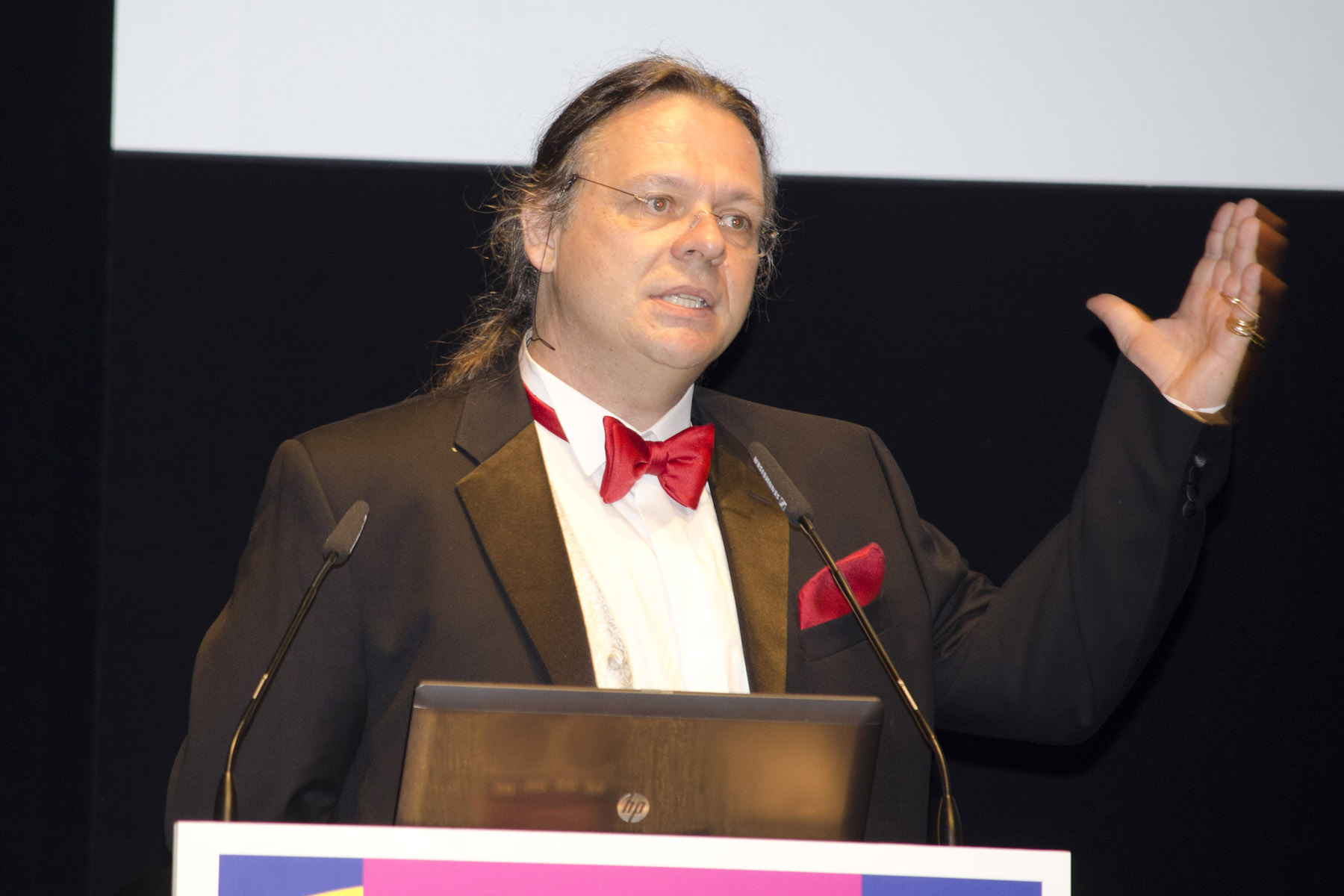
- Burkhard Rost speaking at ISMB
- Born: July 11, 1961 (age 65); Germany
- Education: University of Heidelberg
- Known for: Presidency of ISCB; Organisation of ISMB, CASP; Predictprotein; combination of evolutionary information and machine learning
- Spouse: Karima Djabali
- Awards: Alexander von Humboldt Professor, ISCB Fellows Award
- Scientific career
- Fields: Machine learning; Evolution; Protein structure prediction; Protein function prediction; Sequence analysis; Bioinformatics
- Workplaces: Technichal University of Munich (TUM); LMU Munich; Columbia University; University of Heidelberg; European Molecular Biology Laboratory
- Thesis: Neural networks and evolution - advanced prediction of protein secondary structure (1994)
- Doctoral advisor: Chris Sander
- Website: www.rostlab.org

Burkhard Rost is a scientist leading the Department for Computational Biology & Bioinformatics at the Faculty of Informatics of the Technical University of Munich (TUM). Rost chairs the Study Section Bioinformatics Munich involving the TUM and LMU Munich. From 2007-2014 Rost was President of the International Society for Computational Biology (ISCB).

== Career ==
Rost originally started his scientific career as theoretical physicist. After studying physics at the University of Giessen and physics, history, philosophy, and psychology at the University of Heidelberg, Rost received his PhD at the University Heidelberg for his work at the European Molecular Biology Laboratory (EMBL) in 1994. Following research internships at EMBL and the European Bioinformatics Institute in Cambridge (UK), in 1998, he became assistant professor at the Department of Biochemistry and Molecular Biophysics in the College of Surgeons and Physicians of the CU Medical Center of Columbia University in the City of New York. In 2000, he became associate professor at Columbia University and in 2009 he accepted an appointment to the Chair of Bioinformatics at the Technical University of Munich. He is a member of the New York Academy of Sciences and has been President of ISCB, the International Society for Computational Biology from 2007-2014. As of 2021, Rost has authored or co-authored over 300 scientific publications with a Google Scholar h-index of 100.

== Research ==
Rost research has focused on combining Machine Learning and evolutionary information to predict aspects of critical importance to advance our understanding of evolution, protein structure and protein function. Examples of research carried out in his lab includes the prediction of enzymatic activity (ECGO), interaction partners (ISIS, DISIS, PiNAT), subcellular localization (LOCtree, LOCnet, PredictNLS), functional effects of point mutations/SNPs (SNAP), disordered regions (MD, NORSnet, Ucon), membrane spanning segments (PROF/PHDhtm), secondary structure (PROF/PHD, RePROF, DSSPcont), solvent accessibility (PROF/PHD, RePROF), internal residue-residue contacts (PROFcon) and the clustering of proteins into families (CHOP).

His current focus is on predicting the effects of individual mutations mostly on the level of non-synonymous changes in coding regions, i.e. single nucleotide changes (or Single Nucleotide Polymorphisms) that alter the amino acid sequence.

His group has been dedicated to making their tools available online as demonstrated through the first internet server for protein structure prediction and sequence analysis, Predictprotein, that was launched in 1992, and has been continuously in service ever since. Rost's work has been published in leading peer reviewed scientific journals including Nature, Science, PLOS Genetics.

=== ISCB ===
In 2007 Rost was elected president of the International Society for Computational Biology (ISCB), taking over from Michael Gribskov. Rost served as president until 2014; his successor was Alfonso Valencia.

=== Conferences ===
Rost has co-chaired the largest annual meeting in computational biology ISMB, Intelligent Systems for Molecular Biology, in 2007 (Vienna), 2008 (Toronto), 2011 (Vienna), 2012 (Long Beach). He has initiated and been involved in the organization of several series of international conferences outside the usual northern hemisphere, namely ISCB Africa (2010: Bamako, Mali; 2011: Cape Town, South Africa; 2013: Tunis, Tunisia) in cooperation with the African Society for Bioinformatics and Computational Biology, ISCB Latin America (2010: Montevideo, Uruguay; 2012: Santiago de Chile, Chile; 2014: Rio de Janeiro, Brazil), and most recently ISCB Asia (2011: Kuala Lumpur, Malaysia; 2012: Shen Zhen, China).

Rost has also been a co-organizer of the Critical Assessment of protein Structure Prediction (CASP) meetings from 2002-2008 (CASP4-CASP8).

== Awards and honors ==
Rost was awarded the Professorship of the Alexander von Humboldt Foundation in 2009. He was made a Fellow of the ISCB in 2015. In 2016, he was awarded the Outstanding Contribution to ISCB.

Preceded by Michael Gribskov	President of the International Society for Computational Biology; 2007 – 2015	Succeeded by Alfonso Valencia
