= Carlos Alonso (disambiguation) =

Carlos Alonso (1929-2026) was an Argentine painter.

Carlos Alonso may also refer to:

- Carlos Martínez Alonso (born 1950), State Secretary for Research in the Spanish Ministry for Science and Innovation
- Carlos Alonso Bazalar (born 1990), Peruvian footballer
- Carlos Alonso Gonzalez, "Santillana" (born 1952), Spanish footballer
- Carlos Alonso Kali (born 1978), Angolan footballer
- Carlos Alonso (Nicaraguan footballer) (born 1979), Nicaraguan footballer
