= Janet Kelso =

South African bioinformatician

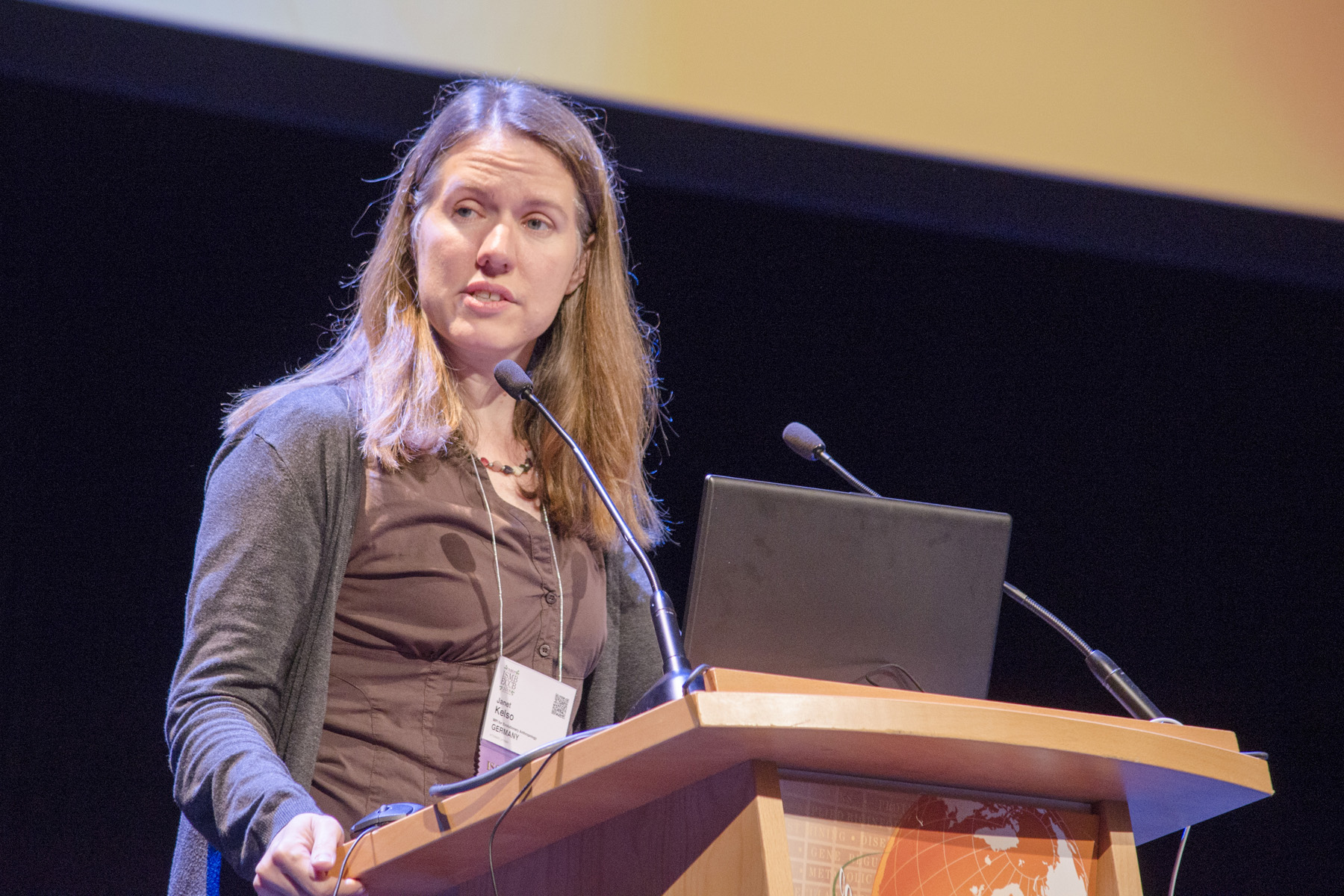
- Janet Kelso speaking at Intelligent Systems for Molecular Biology conference in 2015
- Born: March 24, 1975 (age 51)
- Education: University of Natal; University of Cape Town; University of the Western Cape
- Awards: L'Oréal-UNESCO Awards for Women in Science (2004); Newcomb Cleveland Prize (2010); ISCB Fellow (2016)
- Scientific career
- Fields: Bioinformatics; Computational biology
- Workplaces: Max Planck Institute for Evolutionary Anthropology
- Thesis: The development and application of informatics-based systems for the analysis of the human transcriptome (2003)
- Doctoral advisors: Winston Hide
- Website: www.eva.mpg.de/genetics/bioinformatics/group-staff.html

Janet Kelso (born 1975) is a South African computational biologist and Group leader of the Minerva Research Group for Bioinformatics at the Max Planck Institute for Evolutionary Anthropology. She is best known for her work comparing DNA from previous humans (i.e. Neanderthals) with those of the present (Homo Sapiens).

A previous challenge for computational biologists was the lack of proper DNA preservation and technology to analyze the nuclear genomes of the ancient humans. This obstacle strengthened Kelso's interest in bioinformatics and initially approached the issue using the reference based method. From there, her and her research team have made advances in research towards ancient DNA.

== Education ==
Kelso gained her Bachelor of Science degree from the University of Natal in 1995 followed by Honours and Master of Science degrees in medical biochemistry and chemical pathology from the University of Cape Town in 1997 and 2000, respectively. She received her PhD in bioinformatics in 2003, from the University of the Western Cape, supervised by Winston Hide.

== Research and career ==
Kelso has carried out research in comparative primate genomics and has contributed to the Neanderthal, bonobo and orangutan genome projects. Since 2004, she has been Group leader of the Minerva Research Group for Bioinformatics at the Max Planck Institute for Evolutionary Anthropology in Leipzig, Germany. At the Institute, Kelso conducted her research in collaboration with the UK Biobank (UKB). UKB holds genetic and medical information at population-scale; through the UKB, Kelso and her colleagues discovered a correlation between Neantherthal variants and certain behaviors and traits. For instance, they could now calculate the probability of being an evening or morning person.

Since 2013, she has been co-Executive Editor of the scientific journal Bioinformatics.

== Awards and honors ==
Kelso won a L'Oréal-UNESCO Awards for Women in Science Fellowship in 2004. With her co-authors, she was awarded the Newcomb Cleveland Prize for the most outstanding paper in Science in 2010: this paper published the draft sequence of the Neanderthal genome. Kelso served as Vice President of the International Society for Computational Biology (ISCB) from 2011-2013 and in 2016 was elected to serve another 3-year term as vice president, starting in January 2017. She was elected an ISCB Fellow by the International Society for Computational Biology in 2016.
