= Carlos Martínez Alonso =

Spanish immunologist (born 1950)

- Born: 9 January 1950 (age 76); Villasimpliz
- Education: Complutense University of Madrid
- Awards: Premio México de Ciencia y Tecnología (2014)

Carlos Martínez Alonso, (Carlos Martinez-A.) was born in Villasimpliz (Pola de Gordón), in the province of León, on January 9, 1950. In 1974 he obtained a chemistry degree from the Universidad Complutense of Madrid. Four years later, in 1978, he obtained a Ph.D. in immunology by the same university. He was appointed President of the Spanish National Research Council (CSIC) from 2004 to 2008, and Secretary of State for Research in the Ministry of Science and Innovation from early 2008 to December 2009.

He did his scientific research in several institutions: La Clínica Puerta de Hierro (Autonomous University of Madrid), the Basel Institute for Immunology (Basel, Switzerland), the Umeå University School of Medicine (Umeå, Sweden), the Pasteur Institute (Paris, France), the California Institute of Technology (Pasadena, California, USA), the Severo Ochoa Center for Molecular Biology (Madrid, Spain), with stays in institutions, including the Institute of Immunobiology of the Max Planck Society (Freiburg, Germany), the Ontario Cancer Institute (Toronto, Canada), Millennium Pharmaceuticals (Boston, Massachusetts, USA). He now works at the National Center for Biotechnology (CNB-CSIC) in Madrid, where he was vice-director and founded and directed the Department of Immunology and Oncology from 1996 to 2004, thanks to a large collaborative core grant from Pharmacia/Pfizer.

He is a member of the European Molecular Biology Organization (EMBO) and was the president of the European Molecular Biology Conference from 1995 to 1999, and vice-president of the European Molecular Biology Laboratory (EMBL) in Heidelberg. He is member of the editorial committee of various international journals, and author to more than 400 articles in such scientific journals. In 2004 he was elected president of the Spanish Spanish National Research Council (CSIC). In April 2008 he moved from this position to his present one in the Ministry for Science and Innovation, and was substituted by Rafael Rodrigo Montero at the CSIC presidency.

== Scientific career and awards ==
As an immunologist, he has contributed significantly to the understanding of lymphocyte activation and its implication in autoimmune diseases. He identified some of the mechanisms involved in cytokine- and chemokine-activated signaling pathways and their relevance in HIV-1 infection, cell migration and cancer. Today he is interested in stem cell biology, specifically in the molecular mechanisms that control self-renewal vs. differentiation of these cells, and their implication for cancer, regenerative medicine and inflammation. He has published more than 460 peer-reviewed publications in top journals. Under his leadership, a large number of PhD students and postdoctoral scientists have been trained, many of whom are presently in leading academic and biopharmaceutical institutes worldwide. He is a member of the European Molecular Biology Organization (EMBO), the Academia Europaea, the Hassan II Academy of Sciences and Technologies or Morocco (6), and Doctor honoris causa of several universities. He is a member of Scientific Committees at NATO, Human Frontier Scientific Program (HFSP), the EU and of the editorial board and editor for several scientific publications. He contributes regularly to science dissemination in the media, with more than 70 publications and radio and TV appearances.

He has received awards from the Spanish Royal Academy of Sciences, the Fundación Ciencias de la Salud, as well as the DuPont Prize for Science, the Carmen y Severo Ochoa, the Rey Jaime I Award for Scientific Research, the Lilly Award of Investigación Preclínica, the Government of Castilla and León Prize, the International Galen Award for Scientific Research, the Spanish National Award of Medicine "Gregorio Marañon", and the International Award for Science and Technology of the Government of Mexico. He holds the Gran Cruz de la Orden del Mérito Civil.

== Management and entrepreneurial skills ==
He was a representative of Europe in the NATO Scientific Program, member of the EMBO Scientific Council, President of the EMBC (European Molecular Biology Conference), Vice-president of the EMBL Board of Trustees (European Molecular Biology Laboratory), Vice-president of EUROHORCS (European Heads of Research Organizations) and member of the ESF Executive Board (European Science Foundation). He was Chair for the ERC Starting Grants in 2007 and of the Life Science panel for the ERC Synergy Grants in 2012 and 2013. He was a member of the board of CDTI (Centro para el Desarrollo Tecnológico Industrial), of the executive board of the Spanish National Library, President of INIA (Spanish Institute for Agrobiology), of the Instituto de Salud Carlos III (Spanish Institute for Health Research), IAC (Institute of Astrophysics in the Canary Islands), IEO (Spanish Institute of Oceanography), and CIEMAT (Center for Energy, Environmental and Technological Research). With Antonio Bernad and Cristina Garmendia, he founded the biotechnology company Genetrix, and with Alfonso Valencia, Roderic Guigo and Jose Dopazo, the bioinformatics company Alma.
