= Predrag Radivojac =

- Education: University of Novi Sad; University of Belgrade; Temple University
- Awards: ISCB Fellow (2025)
- Scientific career
- Institutions: Northeastern University
- Thesis: Classification and Knowledge Discovery in Protein Databases (2003)
- Doctoral advisors: Zoran Obradovic; A Keith Dunker

Predrag Radivojac is a Serbian computational biologist and professor of computer science at Northeastern University.

== Education ==
Radivojac gained a BSc in electrical engineering from the University of Novi Sad, Serbia in 1994 and an MSc in electrical engineering from the University of Belgrade. Following a move to the USA, he gained his PhD in computer and information sciences from Temple University in 2003, under the direction of Zoran Obradovic and Keith Dunker.

== Career and research ==
Radivojac joined Dunker's lab at Indiana University as a postdoc; he joined Northeastern University in 2018. His research interests include machine learning, protein function prediction and analysis of post-translational modifications.

== Awards and honours ==
Radivojac received an NSF CAREER award in 2007. He is president of the International Society for Computational Biology (ISCB); his term started in 2024 and is due to end in 2027. In 2025, Radivojac was named by the ISCB as an ISCB Fellow.
