= INB =

- Traded as: (First generation, until 1990) NYSE: INB
- Industry: Financial services
- Founded: (first era) 1886 (second era) 1999
- Defunct: (first era) February 1, 1990
- Fate: (first generation) Sold to First of America Bank in 1989, then to National City in 1997 and later to PNC Bank in 2008.
- Successor: (first era) First of America Bank, then National City in 1997, then later to PNC Bank in 2008.
- Headquarters: Springfield, Illinois, USA
- Number of locations: 13 full-service branches, Remittance Center, lending offices in the St. Louis area, and Miami and Tampa, Florida; more than 40,000 ATMs nationwide
- Key people: Sarah Phalen, Pat Phalen, Tom Gihl, Brett Tiemann, John Wilson, Howard Mooney, Mark Donovan
- Services: Banking, Investments, mortgage loans, wealth management, tax services, lockbox, business and personal banking
- Number of employees: Over 300
- Website: www.inb.com

INB, N.A., formerly Illinois National Bank, is a locally owned, privately held national bank based in Springfield, Illinois. It operates 13 branches and a remittance processing center in central Illinois, as well as loan production offices in Chesterfield, Missouri and Tampa and Miami, Florida.

== First generation ==
The original Illinois National Bank was established in 1886 in Springfield, Illinois. In 1989, the bank was sold to First of America Bank and assumed that name on February 1, 1990. In 1997, First of America was sold to National City Bank, which was in turn sold to PNC Bank in 2008.

== Second generation ==
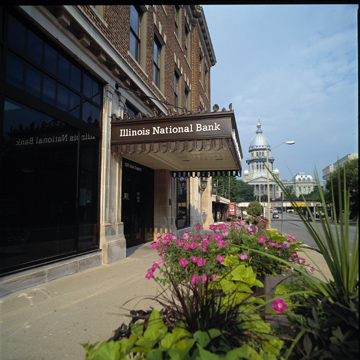
Illinois National Bank, 322 E. Capitol Ave., Springfield, IL

In 1999, a group of Springfield investors and former employees of the first Illinois National Bank came together to form the second generation INB. The new bank opened on June 21, 1999. Beginning with one branch in downtown Springfield, the bank has grown to 13 branches in Central Illinois. INB acquired a remittance processing center in 2000; it is the largest in Illinois outside the Chicago area. Over the years, INB expanded outside the Springfield area by opening branches in Peoria, Bloomington and Champaign. There are loan production offices in the St. Louis metropolitan area and Tampa and Miami, Florida.

In 2019, the bank changed its formal name to INB, National Association – shortened to INB, N.A. or INB for most purposes.

== Services ==
INB offers traditional banking products such as checking and savings accounts, mortgage and other loan services, and certificates of deposit; also retirement products like Individual Retirement Accounts (IRA), remittance processing services, and tax preparation services.
