= Bioinformatics (journal) =

- Discipline: Computational biology
- Language: English
- Edited by: Alfonso Valencia, Janet Kelso

Publication details
- Former name: Computer Applications in the Biosciences
- History: 1998–present
- Publisher: Oxford University Press
- Frequency: Biweekly
- Open access: Hybrid
- Impact factor: 6.937 (2020)

Standard abbreviations
- ISO 4: Bioinformatics

Indexing
- CODEN: BOINFP
- ISSN: 1367-4803 (print); 1367-4811 (web)
- LCCN: 98641767
- OCLC no.: 848277860

Links
- Journal homepage; Online access

Bioinformatics is a biweekly peer-reviewed open-access scientific journal covering research and software in bioinformatics and computational biology. It is an official journal of the International Society for Computational Biology (ISCB), together with Bioinformatics Advances.

The journal was established as Computer Applications in the Biosciences (CABIOS) in 1985. The founding editor-in-chief was Robert J. Beynon. In 1998, the journal obtained its current name and established an online version.

It is published by Oxford University Press and, As of 2014, the editors-in-chief are Alfonso Valencia and Janet Kelso.

Previous editors include Chris Sander, Gary Stormo, Christos Ouzounis, Martin Bishop, and Alex Bateman. In 2014, these five editors were appointed the first Honorary Editors.

According to the Journal Citation Reports, the journal has a 2024 impact factor of 5.4.

From 1998 to 2004, Bioinformatics was the official journal of the ISCB. In 2004, as many ISCB members had institutional subscriptions, the society did not renew its contract.

As of 2005, PLOS Computational Biology became an official ISCB journal. In January 2009, Bioinformatics again became an official journal of the ISCB, alongside PLOS Computational Biology. The ISCB currently designates Bioinformatics Advances and Bioinformatics as its official journals.

The proceedings of the Intelligent Systems for Molecular Biology and the European Conference on Computational Biology have been published in special issues of Bioinformatics since 2001 and 2002, respectively.

Following budget problems, Greek universities dropped their subscriptions in 2013.
