= International Human Epigenomics Consortium =

Global research organization

The International Human Epigenomics Consortium (IHEC) was launched in 2010 to coordinate global efforts in the field of epigenomics. IHEC aims to generate at least 1,000 reference baseline human epigenomes from different types of normal and disease-related human cell types.
