= International Society for Computational Biology =

Scholarly society

- Abbreviation: ISCB
- Formation: 1997; 29 years ago
- Type: Learned society
- Headquarters: Leesburg, Virginia, United States
- Members: ~4,100 (2025)
- President: Predrag Radivojac
- Key people: Thomas Lengauer (Immediate Past President); Alex Bateman (Vice President); Russell Schwartz (Vice President); Xuegong Zhang (Vice President); Michelle Brazas (Secretary); Tandy Warnow (Treasurer); Diane E. Kovats (Chief Executive Officer)
- Subsidiaries: ISCB Student Council
- Website: iscb.org

The International Society for Computational Biology (ISCB) is a scholarly society for researchers in computational biology and bioinformatics. The society was founded in 1997 to provide a stable financial home for the Intelligent Systems for Molecular Biology (ISMB) conference and has grown into a larger society that aims to advance understanding of living systems through computation and to communicate scientific advances worldwide.

In addition to ISMB, the society also organizes a growing number of smaller, more regionally or topically focused conferences and presents multiple annual scientific achievement awards, including the Overton Prize and the ISCB Senior Scientist Awards.

== Overview ==
ISCB organizes the Intelligent Systems for Molecular Biology (ISMB) conference every year, a growing number of smaller, more regionally or topically focused annual and bi-annual conferences, and has three official journals: ISCB Community Journal, PLOS Computational Biology and Bioinformatics. The society awards three scientific achievement awards annually: the Overton Prize, the ISCB Innovator Award, and the ISCB Senior Scientist Awards. The society annually elects ISCB Fellows to honor members that have distinguished themselves through outstanding contributions to the fields of computational biology, and bioinformatics. The ISCB also awards the ISCB Outstanding Contributions Award to recognize members of the community who have significantly contributed to the organization's success.

== History ==
=== Founding ===
The Intelligent Systems for Molecular Biology (ISMB) conference series began in 1993. In response to the expansion of the conference, the ISCB was founded in 1997, with a significant part of its remit being to provide a stable financial home for ISMB. The ISCB was legally incorporated in early 1997, with Lawrence Hunter elected as its inaugural president by the members of the founding board of directors, which included Russ Altman, Philip Bourne, David States, and Alfonso Valencia. The ISCB has organized the ISMB conference since 1998.

During the next few years, the focus remained on management of the annual ISMB conference, whose 1993 attendance of approximately 200 researchers had more than tripled by 1999.

The new millennium brought in a new president in Russ Altman, currently chair of Stanford University's department of bioengineering and director of the program in biomedical informatics, and over 1,200 delegates attended ISMB 2000 in San Diego. Altman took steps to formalize some of the legal and administrative aspects of ISCB before passing the torch in 2002 to Philip Bourne, currently professor in the department of pharmacology and Skaggs School of Pharmacy and Pharmaceutical Sciences at the University of California, San Diego. Bourne gave ISCB a more permanent home at UCSD, which included the university's commitment to host the society through at least 2005 and its offer of staff support. Although Bourne served as president for only one year, he left his mark on the organization by increasing the interaction with regional groups and conference organizers worldwide and through an improved web presence. During his tenure, membership grew to more than 1,700 researchers, and the 2002 ISMB conference in Edmonton, Alberta, Canada, welcomed over 1,600 attendees.

=== Expansion ===
Michael Gribskov, who then served at the University of California, San Diego's San Diego Supercomputer Center, and is now working at Purdue University's Department of Biological Sciences, was elected president in 2003. That year, ISMB took place in Brisbane, Australia, which was the first time the meeting was held outside North America or Europe. This phase brought many uncertainties for the society when attendance dropped to one-half of budgeted expectations due to travel fears and restrictions related to outbreaks of Severe Acute Respiratory Syndrome or SARS, the start of the war in Iraq, and the location, which broke with the pattern of North American and European venues. Although scientifically successful, the financial losses of ISMB 2003 left ISCB financially unstable for the first time in its history.

In part to reduce ISCB's dependence on ISMB proceeds to fund the society's activities and annual overhead costs, a pilot regional conference was hosted in the US to gauge interest in smaller, localized meetings. In December 2003, the Rocky Mountain Regional Bioinformatics conference, Rocky 1, was launched in Aspen, Colorado. The meeting has been held annually ever since and now attracts attendees from around the world.

In 2005, as part of the society's discussions about the role of publications and the society's official journal, accompanied by the advent of open-access publishing, the ISCB announced a partnership with the Public Library of Science and launched a new open-access journal, PLoS Computational Biology. The journal is intended to emphasize computational methods applied to living systems at all scales, from molecular biology to patient populations and ecosystems, and which offer insight for experimentalists. Past president and past publications committee chair Phil Bourne served as the new publication's editor-in-chief, and he remains in that role. The first issue of the new journal coincided with the opening day of ISMB 2005, held in Detroit, Michigan.

Burkhard Rost, then professor in the department of biochemistry and molecular biophysics at Columbia University and now the Alexander von Humboldt Professor and chair of bioinformatics and computational biology, computational sciences at the Technical University of Munich, succeeded Michael Gribskov as president in 2007 and has been re-elected twice, with a current term expiration set for January 2013. Under his tenure, the ISMB/ECCB 2007 conference in Vienna, Austria, chaired by Thomas Lengauer of the Max Planck Institute for Informatics, and co-chaired by Burkhard Rost and Peter Schuster of the University of Vienna, was further expanded to include a total of eight parallel tracks, and the 2007 conference attendance of approximately 1,700 was back on track with expectations. Vienna as a destination and the Austria Center Vienna were both so well received by the conference organizers and attendees alike that it was selected to host the 2011 conference as well, which is a first for the ISMB series that had never before repeated a location.

In 2010, the first ISCB Latin America was held in Montevideo, Uruguay.

== Leadership and Structure ==
A president, an executive committee, and a board of directors comprise ISCB's scientific leadership, drawing on distinguished, internationally renowned researchers who are elected for their term by the general society membership. The executive director leads the ISCB staff and supports a diverse set of committees dedicated to specific issues that are important to the computational biology and bioinformatics community, including education, policy, and publications.

=== Presidents ===
As of 2025, Predrag Radivojac is President of the ISCB; his term started in 2024 and will expire in 2027.

Presidents of the International Society for Computational Biology
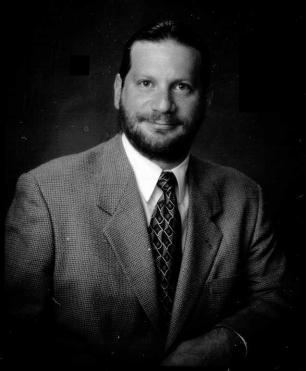
Lawrence Hunter
(1997-2000)

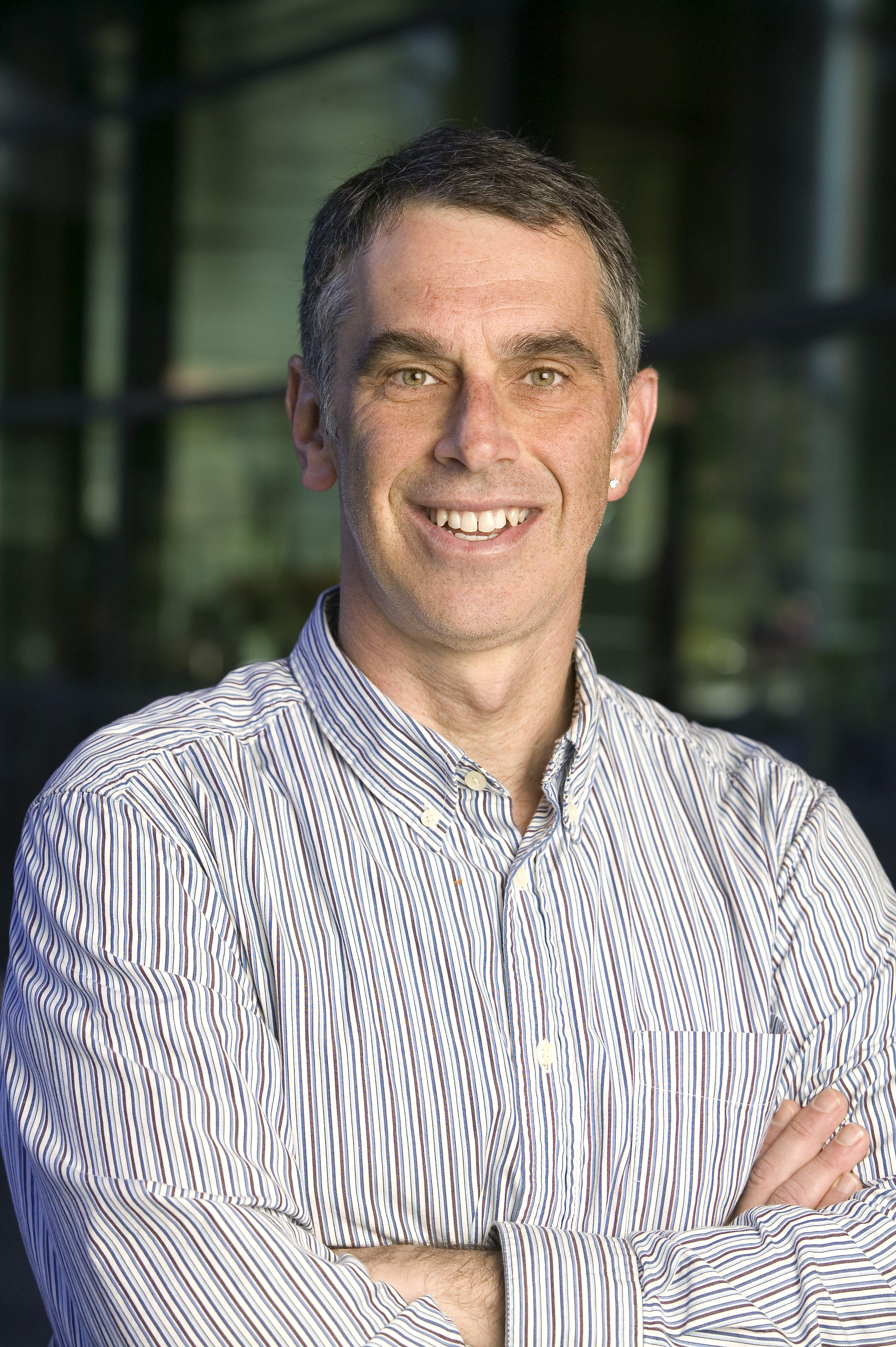
Russ Altman
(2000-2002)

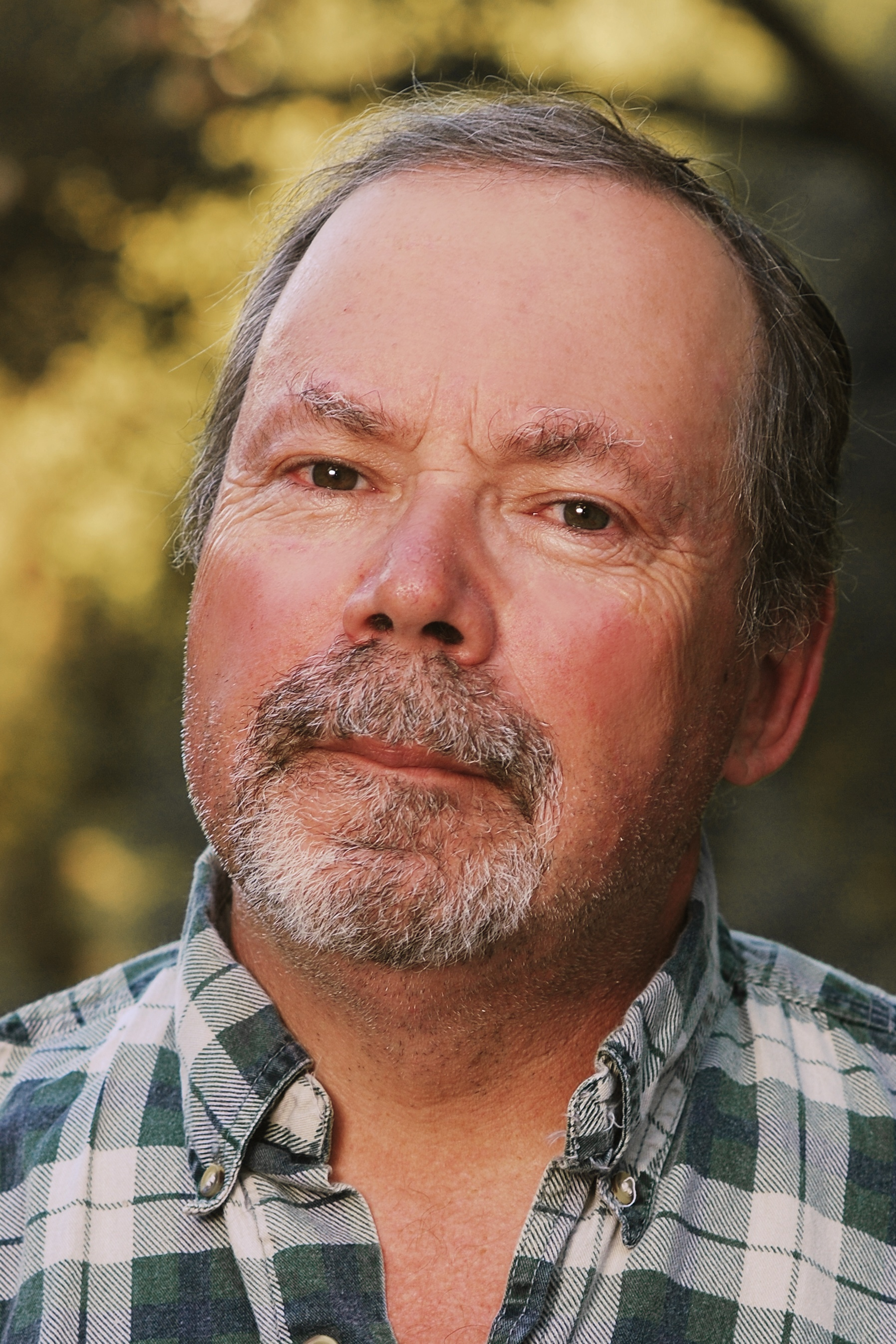
Philip Bourne
(2002-2003)

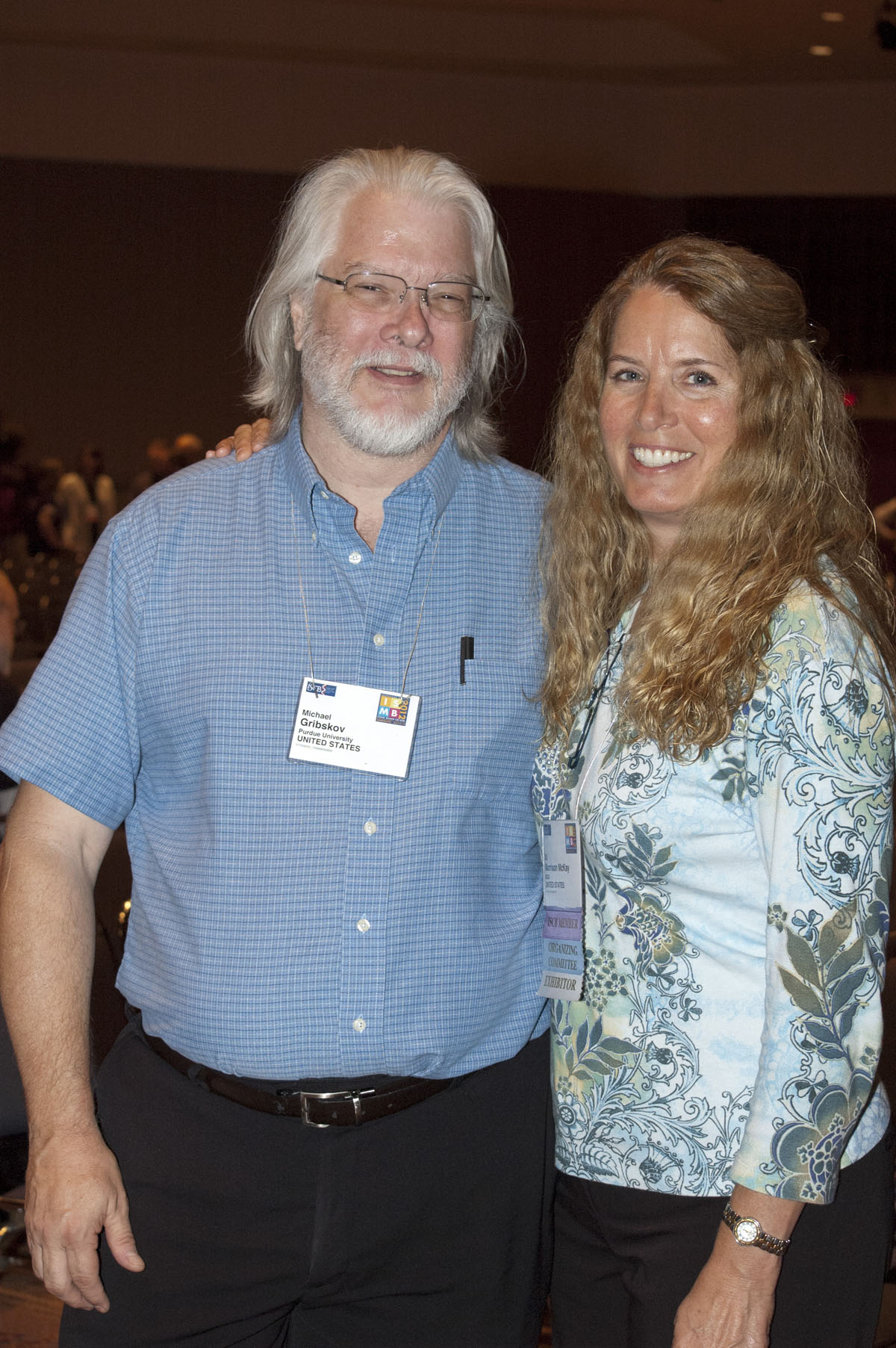
Michael Gribskov (left)
(2003-2007)

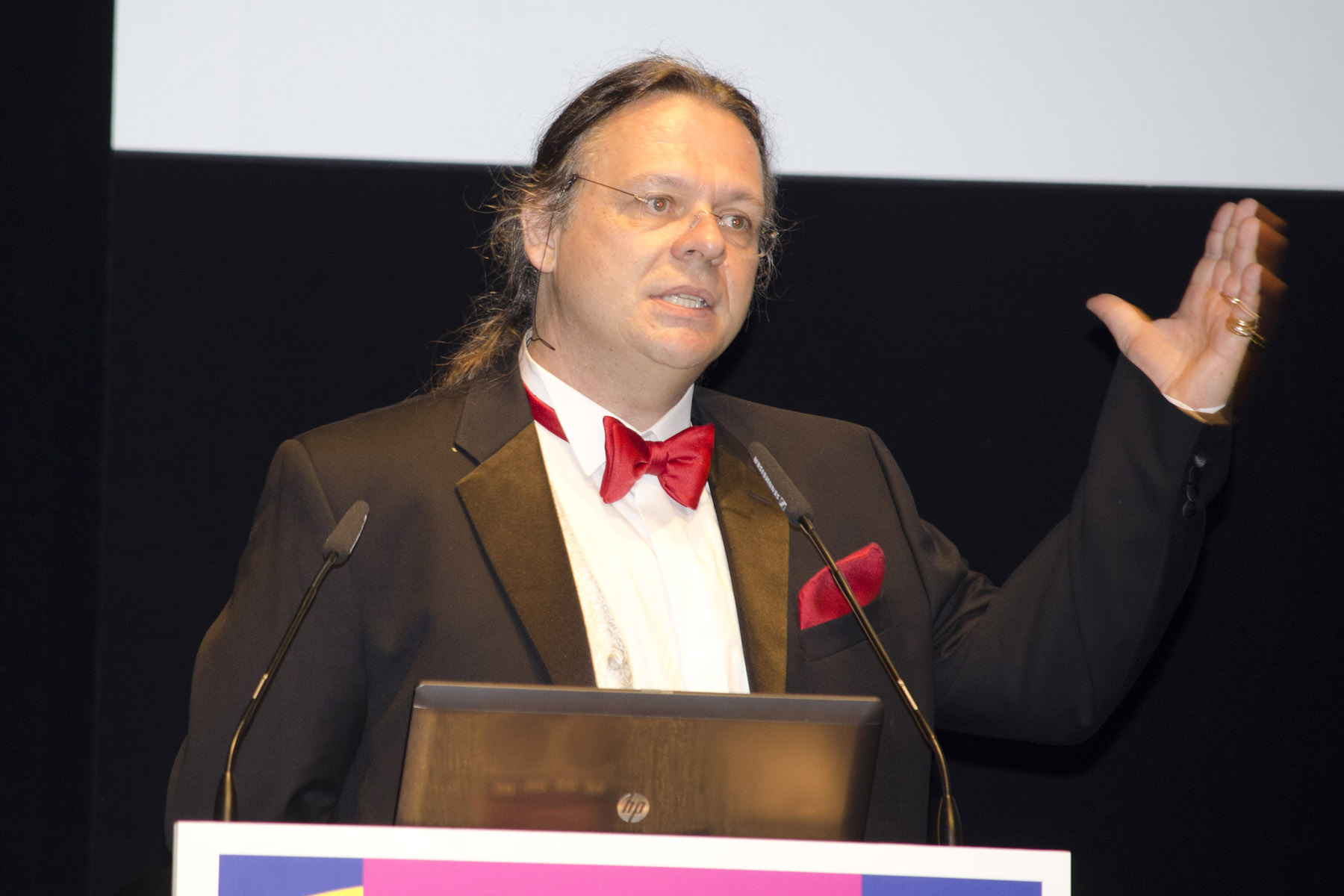
Burkhard Rost
(2007-2014)

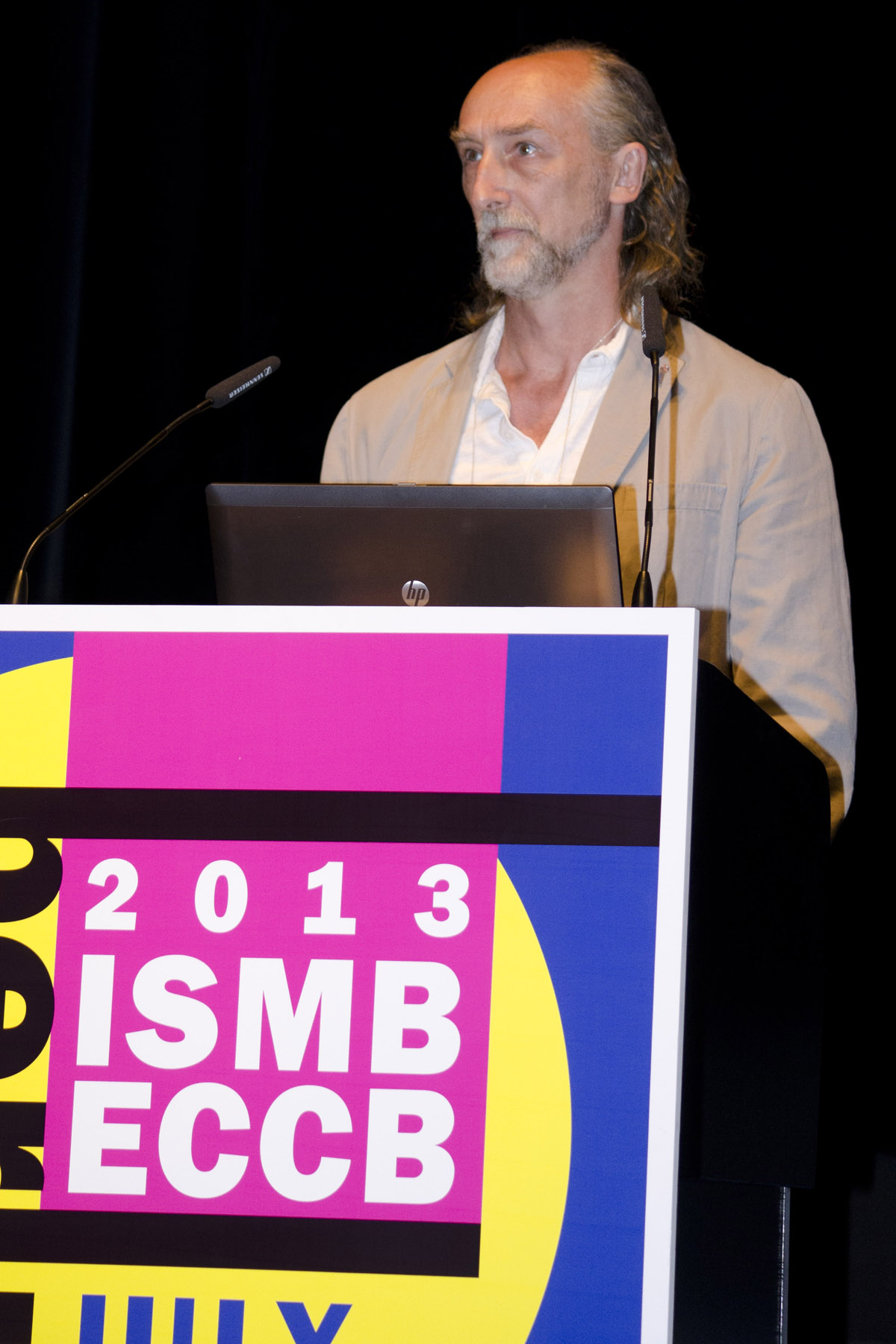
Alfonso Valencia
(2015-2018)

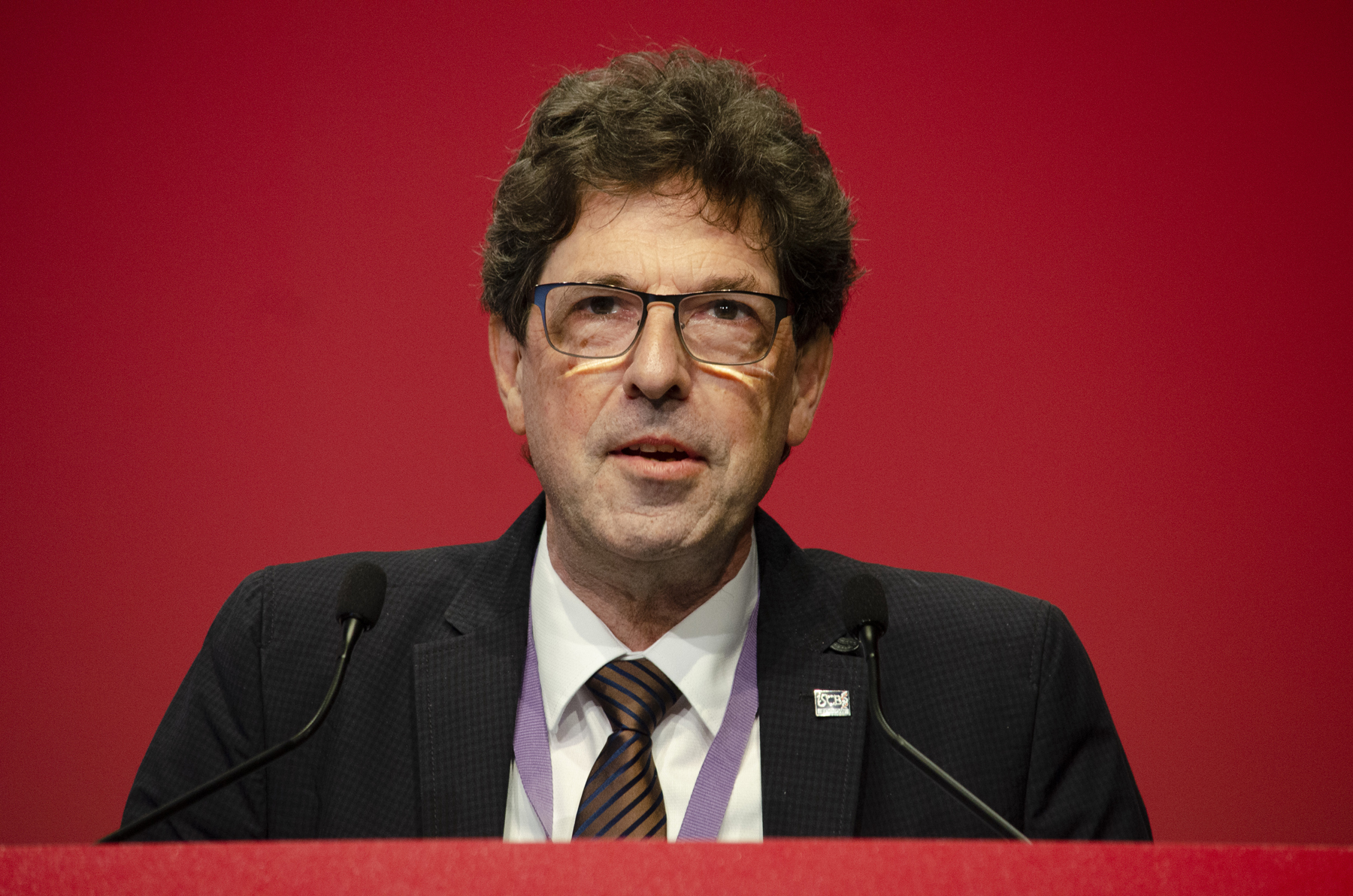
Thomas Lengauer
(2018-2021)

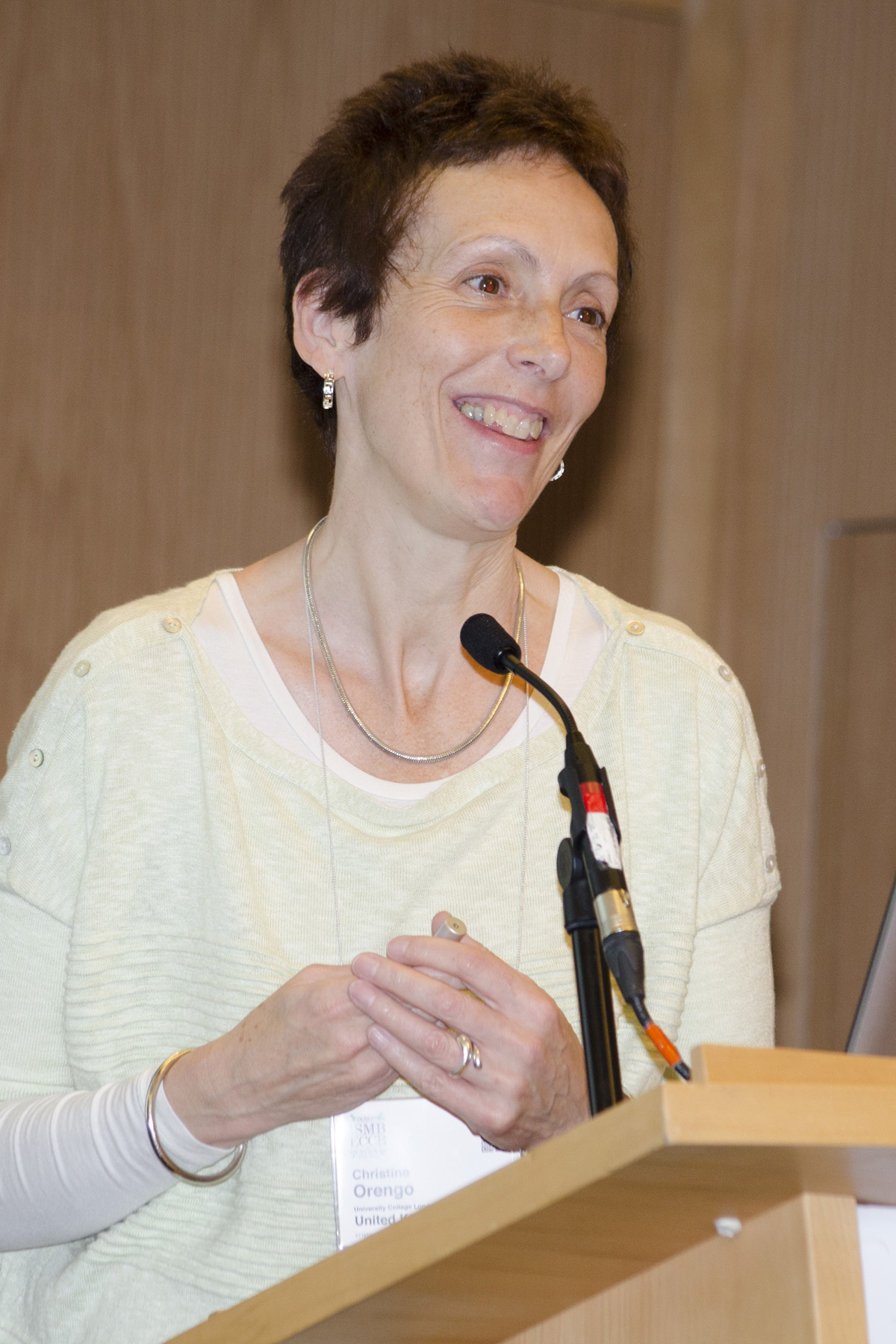
Christine Orengo
(2021-2024)

=== Board of directors ===
As of 2018, notable members of the board of directors include: Alex Bateman, Bonnie Berger, Terry Gaasterland, Janet Kelso, Thomas Lengauer, Yves Moreau, Christine Orengo, Burkhard Rost, Alfonso Valencia, and Martin Vingron.

=== Fellows ===
The ISCB has elected Fellows since 2009. These distinctions are awarded in honour of outstanding contributions to the fields of computational biology and bioinformatics. The inaugural Class was given to previous recipients of the ISCB Accomplishment by a Senior Scientist Award; in the following years, the ISCB has sought nominations for Fellows from its members. Fellows are traditionally introduced at the ISCB's flagship Intelligent Systems for Molecular Biology conference each year. As of the Class of 2025, 162 Fellows have been elected.

=== Communities of Special Interest (COSIs) ===
ISCB Communities of Special Interest (COSIs) are member communities of shared interest that have self-organized and have multiple activities or interactions throughout the year, rather than solely meeting during the SIG program of the ISMB conference. An important goal of any COSI is to foster a topically-focused collaborative community wherein scientists communicate with one another on research problems and/or opportunities in specific areas of computational biology. Such communication is often in the form of meetings, but can also be through other social media tools that allow for vibrant participation in a virtual environment.

=== Student Council ===
In 2004, the ISCB Student Council was founded by Manuel Corpas to promote the development of a worldwide community for computational biology students. One of the main roles of the student council is to promote soft skills in order to develop potential in bioinformatics and computational biology trainees. As of 2017, the student council represents more than 1,000 students worldwide.

== Conferences ==
ISCB grew out of the need for a stable organizational structure to support the planning and manage the finances of the Intelligent Systems for Molecular Biology (ISMB) conference series, which had its start in 1993. ISMB is ISCB's most prominent annual activity, toward which a significant portion of resources is dedicated each year. Since 2004, when ISMB has been held in Europe, it has been held jointly with the European Conference on Computational Biology (ECCB).

ISCB began expanding its conference offerings with the introduction of the annual Rocky Mountain Bioinformatics Conference series in 2003, the Conference on Semantics in Healthcare and Life Sciences (CSHALS) in 2008, the bi-annual ISCB Africa ASBCB Bioinformatics Conference in 2009, and the bi-annual ISCB Latin America Conference in 2010. ISCB also hosts an annual Great Lakes Bioinformatics Conference and partners with RECOMB to produce the Regulatory and Systems Genomics Conference with DREAM Challenges. The ISCB-Asia meeting was started in 2012 and continues to take shape after its last conference in 2014 in Japan in conjunction with GIW.

In addition to ISCB-organized conferences, the society supports other computational biology and bioinformatics conferences through affiliations and sponsorships. These include the annual Pacific Symposium on Biocomputing (PSB), the annual international conference on Research in Computational Molecular Biology (RECOMB), the annual International Conference on Bioinformatics (InCoB), and the annual general meeting of the European Molecular Biology Network (EMBnet).

== Official journals ==
- In 1998, Bioinformatics became the official journal of the ISCB. Dues-paying members of the society benefited from an online subscription to the journal. ISMB conference proceedings have been published in Bioinformatics since 2001. In 2004, as many ISCB members had institutional subscriptions to Bioinformatics, ISCB decided not to renew its contract with the journal. In January 2009, Bioinformatics again became an official journal of the ISCB, alongside PLOS Computational Biology.
- PLOS Computational Biology is an open-access, peer-reviewed journal published monthly by the Public Library of Science (PLOS). It became an official journal of ISCB in 2005.
- In 2015, ISCB announced the formation of the ISCB Community Journal, a dedicated channel on the F1000Research online publishing platform, providing members the opportunity to openly publish research articles regardless of their format or perceived impact.

== Affiliated organizations ==
The ISCB has several affiliated organizations (mainly regional), including the European Molecular Biology Network (EMBnet), the Netherlands Bioinformatics Centre (NBIC), the African Society for Bioinformatics and Computational Biology, and the Japanese Society for Bioinformatics.

The ISCB is also a founding member of the Global Organisation for Bioinformatics Learning, Education and Training (GOBLET). In collaboration with GOBLET, the ISCB is involved in developing core competencies for different types of bioinformatics trainees; these competencies are being used in the development of new bioinformatics curricula.
