= Spanish National Center for Biotechnology =

Part of the Spanish National Research Council

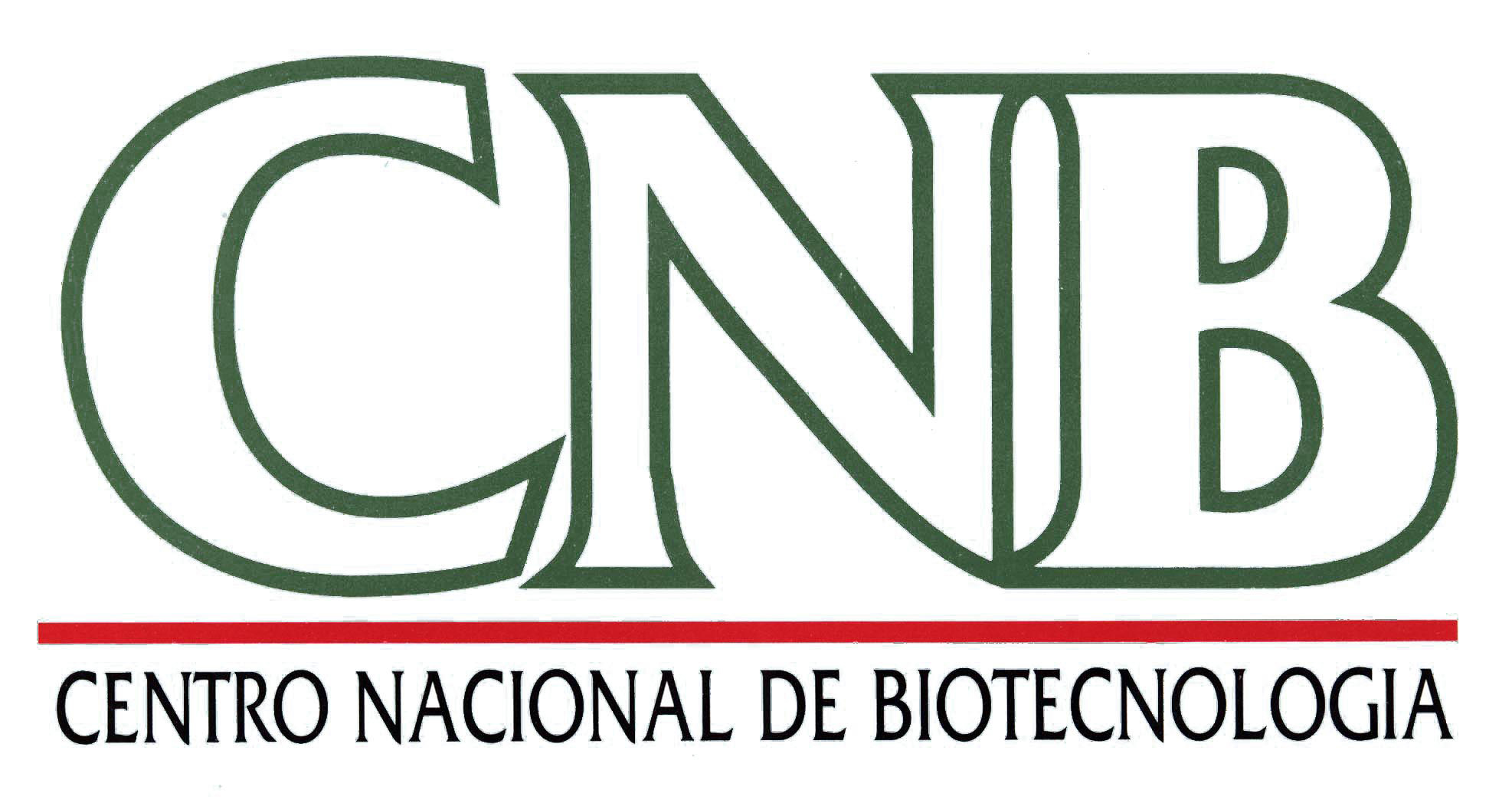

Agency overview
- Formed: January 24, 1985
- Jurisdiction: Spain
- Headquarters: Calle Darwin nº 3, Campus de Cantoblanco. 28049 Madrid
- Employees: 676 (as December 2011)
- Annual budget: 24 million €
- Agency executive: José María Valpuesta Moralejo, Director
- Website: http://www.cnb.csic.es

The National Center for Biotechnology (CNB) forms part of the Spanish National Research Council (CSIC), the largest public research institution in Spain.

The CNB was founded in 1992 to promote research in advanced biotechnology and molecular biology, and to act as a link between basic research and industrial applications.

== Mission ==
The stated mission of the CNB is the generation of scientific knowledge and its application to solving human and animal health issues, environmental, and agricultural challenges, whilst collaborating with industries and ensuring the transfer of technology.

The CNB trains personnel, offers biotechnology-oriented counselling to companies and public institutions, and publishes its scientific activity in specialized journals and press media.

The most relevant stated missions of the CNB are the following:

- Focus the effort in life sciences research towards a society and an economy based on knowledge
- Use this knowledge as a tool to be applied to health, agriculture and environment
- Offer services in new technologies to the academic community and private companies
- Stimulate private companies towards research and development for biological problems

== Research ==
A diagram showing the structure of HIV virus. The group of Mariano Esteban have generated a vaccine which already passed the phase I clinical trials

The CNB is a multidisciplinary research centre that concentrates on the areas of structural biology, molecular biology, virology, microbiology, plant biology, immunology and oncology, and systems and synthetic biology. Research is used to generate useful applications.

Specific projects focus on structural biology of large macromolecules, genomics and functional proteomics, development of biocomputing tools, control of cell growth and cancer, mechanisms of aging and apoptosis, development of animal models for chronic autoimmune diseases, infectious and cancer-like diseases, construction of vaccines for humans and farm animals, development of tools to improve plant productivity and resistance to environmental stress, development of new processes for environmental recovery based on microorganisms, production of antibiotics and hydrolytic enzymes, and discovery of immunomodulatory compounds.

A Program on Systems and Synthetic Biology provides computational and materials tools for modelling complex biological phenomena and reprogramming them in a biotechnological direction.

== Technology transfer ==
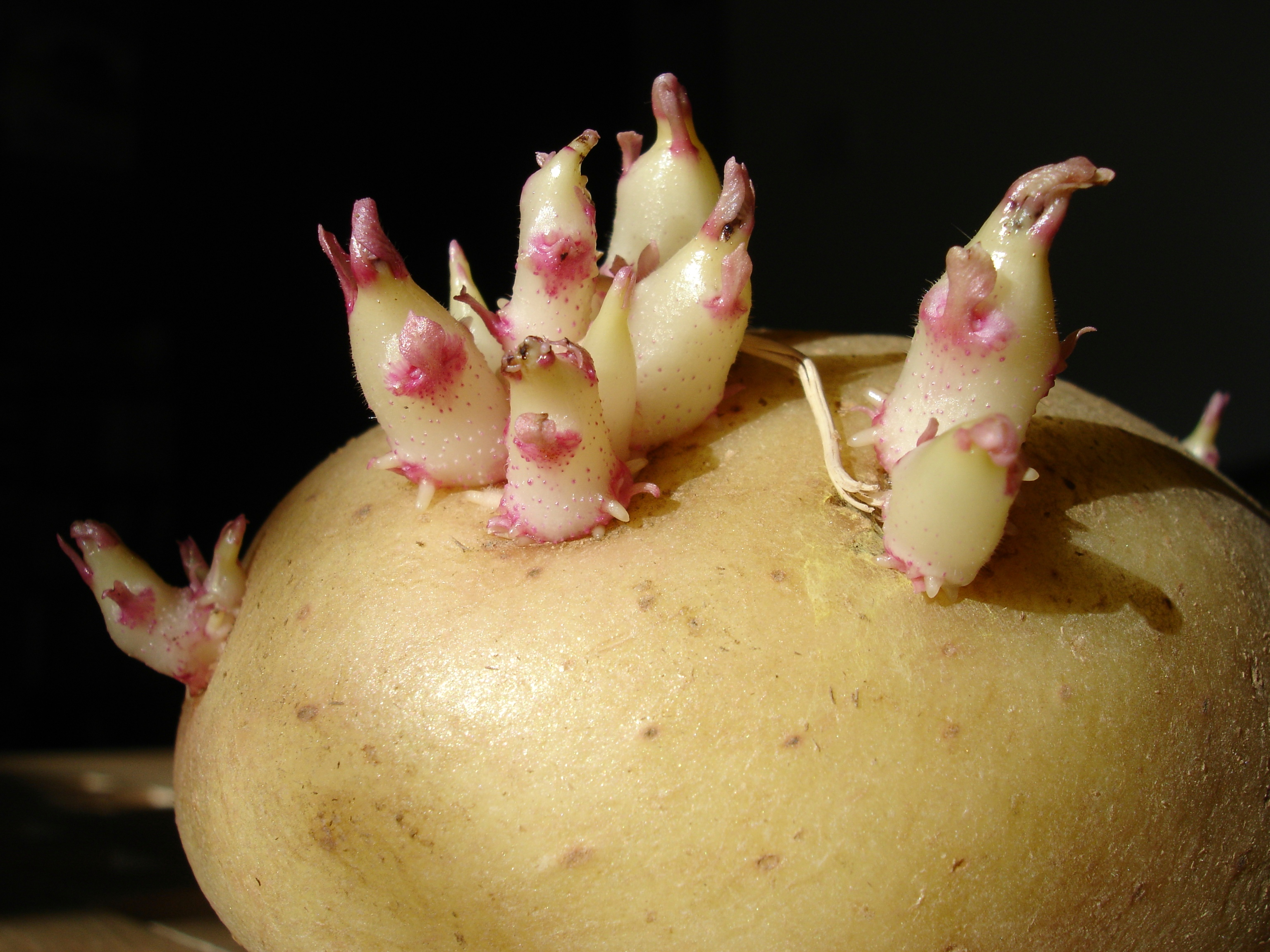
The group of Salomé Prat generated transgenic potatoes which would be able to grow in sub-Saharan Africa.

As a biotechnology center the CNB over the 2005-2009 period signed 225 research contracts with companies around the world (amounting to €37.4m).

During the same period, 87 patents were applied for, of which 33 were for new inventions, 33 were applications for entry into the international PCT phase, and 21 mainly for European and US applications. Thirteen of these patents have been licensed. CNB scientists established five biotechnology companies in the period from 2005 to 2009, some of them in the CNB spin-off incubator. The CNB is a member of ASEBIO, the largest Spanish biotechnological business association, which also includes companies such as 3PBIOVIAN. The CNB maintains regular contacts with other members in search of common matters of interest; these include a number of joint grants for which companies and the CNB have applied to different government agencies. . Of these, 12 projects were granted duting 2005-2009 in programs such as PETRI and PROFIT (amounting to €1.87m).

== Organization ==
It is one of the largest Spanish research institutes, with a total staff of 676 as of December 2011, of which 381 were scientific staff (65 PIs, 10 research associates, 113 PhD students and 198 postdoctoral scientists), and 236 technical and administrative staff.

The CNB is divided into five departments:

- Macromolecular Structure Department
- Molecular and Cell Biology Department
- Microbial Biotechnology Department
- Plant Genetics Department
- Immunology and Oncology Department

and a Program on Systems and Synthetic Biology

== Directors ==
Years	Director
1987 - 1990	Michael Parkhouse
1990 - 1992	José López Carrascosa
1992 - 2003	Mariano Esteban
2003 - 2007	José Ramón Naranjo Orovio
Since 2007	José María Valpuesta Moralejo
