= Spanish National Bioinformatics Institute =

Spanish academic institute

The Spanish National Bioinformatics Institute (INB-ISCIII; Spanish: Instituto Nacional de Bioinformática) is an academic service institution that coordinates, integrates and develops bioinformatics resources in Spain. Created in 2003, the INB has served as the main connecting node between the Carlos III Health Institute and ELIXIR, a European-wide infrastructure of life science data, since 2015. The infrastructure coordinates other Spanish institutions partaking in the initiative such as the Spanish National Cancer Research Centre (CNIO), the Centre for Genomic Regulation (CRG), the Universitat Pompeu Fabra, the Institute for Research in Biomedicine (IRB) and the Barcelona's National Supercomputing Center.

It consists of 10 distributed nodes, coordinated by a central node, encompassing the scopes of genomics, proteomics, functional genomics, structural biology, population genomics and genome diversity, health informatics, algorithm development and high-performance computing.

It is the Spanish participant in the common data platform promoted by the European Union to ensure a rapid and coordinated response to the health crisis caused by COVID-19. Their MareNostrum supercomputer has been used for testing the potential efficacy of compounds against SARS-CoV-2.

Alfonso Valencia, former president of the International Society for Computational Biology, is the director.
