= PLOS Computational Biology =

- Discipline: computational biology, bioinformatics
- Language: English
- Edited by: Feilim Mac Gabhann, and Virginia Pitzer

Publication details
- History: 2005–present
- Publisher: Public Library of Science
- Frequency: Monthly
- Open access: Yes
- License: Creative Commons Attribution License
- Impact factor: 3.6 (2024)

Standard abbreviations
- ISO 4: PLOS Comput. Biol.
- NLM: PLoS Comput Biol

Indexing
- CODEN: PCBLBG
- ISSN: 1553-734X (print); 1553-7358 (web)
- LCCN: 2004216490
- OCLC no.: 57176662

Links
- Journal homepage; Online access; Online archive

PLOS Computational Biology is a monthly peer-reviewed open access scientific journal covering computational biology. It was established in 2005 by the Public Library of Science in association with the International Society for Computational Biology (ISCB) in the same format as the previously established PLOS Biology and PLOS Medicine. The founding editor-in-chief was Philip Bourne. The current editors-in-chief are Feilim Mac Gabhann and Virginia E. Pitzer.

== Format ==
The journal publishes both original research and review articles. All articles are open access and licensed under the Creative Commons Attribution License.

Since its inception, the journal has published the Ten Simple Rules series of practical guides, which has subsequently become one of the journal's most read article series.

The Ten Simple Rules series then led to the Quick Tips collection, whose articles contain recommendations on computational practices and methods, and provide concise, actionable guidance for researchers, such as dimensionality reduction.

In 2012, it launched the Topic Page review format, which dual-publishes peer-reviewed articles both in the journal and on Wikipedia. It was the first publication of its kind to publish in this way.

== See also ==
- PLOS
- PLOS Biology
- BMC Bioinformatics
