= Intelligent Systems for Molecular Biology =

Annual academic conference

- ISMB 2016 Logo
- Frequency: Annually
- Locations: Calgary, Alberta, Canada (2028) TBD (2027) Washington, D.C., United States (2026) Liverpool, England, United Kingdom (2025) Montreal, Quebec, Canada (2024) Lyon, France (2023) Madison, Wisconsin, United States (2022) Virtual event (2021) Virtual event (2020) Basel, Switzerland (2019) Chicago, Illinois, United States (2018) Prague, Czech Republic (2017) Orlando, Florida, United States (2016) Dublin, Leinster, Ireland (2015) Boston, Massachusetts, United States (2014) Berlin, Germany (2013) Long Beach, California, United States (2012) Vienna, Austria (2011) Boston, Massachusetts, United States (2010) Stockholm, Sweden (2009) Toronto, Ontario, Canada (2008) Vienna, Austria (2007) Fortaleza, Ceará, Brazil (2006) Detroit, Michigan, United States (2005) Glasgow, Scotland, United Kingdom (2004) Brisbane, Queensland, Australia (2003) Edmonton, Alberta, Canada (2002) Copenhagen, Denmark (2001) La Jolla, California, United States (2000) Heidelberg, Germany (1999) Montreal, Quebec, Canada (1998) Halkidiki, Greece (1997) St. Louis, Missouri, United States (1996) Cambridge, England, United Kingdom (1995) Palo Alto, California, United States (1994) Bethesda, Maryland, United States (1993)
- Years active: 33
- Previous event: ISMB/ECCB 2025
- Next event: ISMB 2026
- Attendance: 2,000
- Organiser: Teresa Przytycka, Pierre Baldi (2016 chairs)
- Member: International Society for Computational Biology
- Website: www.iscb.org/ismb2022

Intelligent Systems for Molecular Biology (ISMB) is an annual academic conference on the subjects of bioinformatics and computational biology organised by the International Society for Computational Biology (ISCB). The principal focus of the conference is on the development and application of advanced computational methods for biological problems. The conference has been held every year since 1993 and has grown to become one of the largest and most prestigious meetings in these fields, hosting over 2,000 delegates in 2004. From the first meeting, ISMB has been held in locations worldwide; since 2007, meetings have been located in Europe and North America in alternating years. Since 2004, European meetings have been held jointly with the European Conference on Computational Biology (ECCB).

The main ISMB conference is usually held over three days and consists of presentations, poster sessions and keynote talks. Most presentations are given in multiple parallel tracks; however, keynote talks are presented in a single track and are chosen to reflect outstanding research in bioinformatics. Notable ISMB keynote speakers have included eight Nobel laureates. The recipients of the ISCB Overton Prize and ISCB Accomplishment by a Senior Scientist Award are invited to give keynote talks as part of the programme. The proceedings of the conference are currently published by the journal Bioinformatics.

== History ==
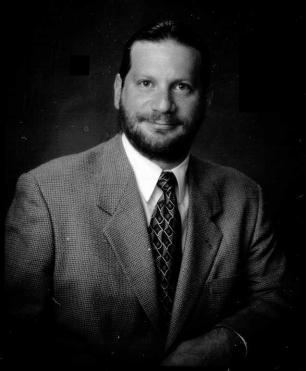
Lawrence Hunter, co-chair of the first ISMB conference.

=== Early meetings ===
The origins of the ISMB conference lie in a workshop for artificial intelligence researchers with an interest in molecular biology held in November 1991. The workshop was organised by American researcher Lawrence Hunter, then director of the Machine Learning Project at the United States National Institutes of Health's National Library of Medicine (NLM) in Bethesda, Maryland. A subsequent workshop on the same topic held in 1992, hosted by the NLM and the National Science Foundation, made it clear that a regular international conference for the field was required. Such a conference would be dedicated to molecular biology as a rapidly emerging application of artificial intelligence. Having successfully applied for grants from AAAI, NIH and the Department of Energy Office of Health and Environmental Research, the first ISMB conference was held in July 1993, at the NLM. The conference was chaired by Hunter, David Searls (research associate professor at University of Pennsylvania School of Medicine) and Jude Shavlik (assistant professor of computer science at University of Wisconsin–Madison) and attracted over 200 attendees from 13 countries, submitting 69 scientific papers.

The success of the first conference prompted the announcement of a second ISMB conference at the end of the meeting. ISMB 1994 was initially planned to be held in Seattle. However, a competing meeting forced ISMB to change venues at short notice. The conference was held at Stanford University in August 1994 and was organised by Russ Altman, a research scientist at Stanford University School of Medicine. To emphasise the international aspect of the conference, ISMB 1995 was held at Robinson College, Cambridge. ISMB 1995 also marked a shift in the focus of the conference. ISCB Board member and Director of the Spanish National Bioinformatics Institute Alfonso Valencia has stated that, in 1995, "the conference changed from a computer science-based conference to a point where everyone realized that, if you want to make progress, there has to be more focus in biology."

=== Formation of ISCB and expansion ===
ISMB 1997 was held in Halkidiki, Greece and marked the foundation of the International Society for Computational Biology (ISCB). ISCB was formed with a focus on managing all scientific, organizational and financial aspects of the ISMB conference and to provide a forum for scientists to address the emerging role of computers in the biological sciences. ISCB has assisted in organising the ISMB conference series since 1998. The period following the formation of ISCB also marked an expansion in the number of ISMB attendees: ISMB 2000 (held at the University of California, San Diego) was attended by over 1,000 delegates, submitting 141 scientific papers. This meeting was also the last time ISMB would be held at a university, due to size limitations.

=== Partnership with ECCB ===
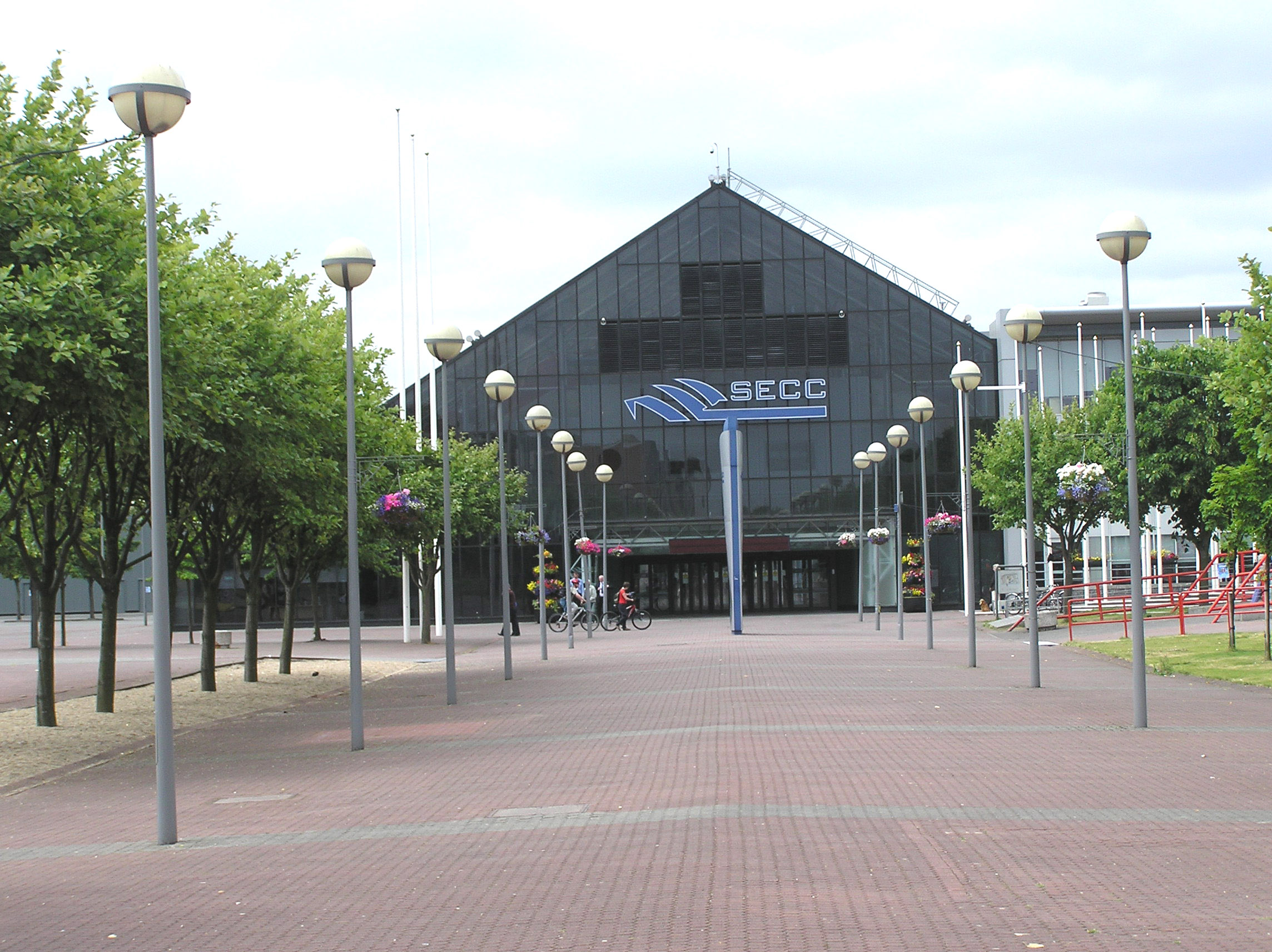
The first joint conference with ECCB was held in 2004 at the Scottish Exhibition and Conference Centre.

In 2004, ISMB was jointly held with the European Conference on Computational Biology for the first time. The conference was also co-located with the Genes, Proteins and Computers conference. This meeting, held in Glasgow, UK, was the largest bioinformatics conference ever held, attended by 2,136 delegates, submitting 496 scientific papers. Alfonso Valencia considers ISMB/ECCB 2004 to be an important milestone in the history of ISMB: "it was the first one where the balance between Europe and the States became an important part of the conference. It was here that we established the rules and the ways and the spirit of collaboration between the Americans and the Europeans." The success of the joint conference paved the way for future European ISMB meetings to be held jointly with ECCB.

=== Recent meetings ===
By the end of 2006, ISCB was in financial difficulty. Two conferences (ISMB 2003, in Brisbane and ISMB 2006, in Fortaleza) had drastically reduced numbers of participants due to their location, with a corresponding reduction in income. To allow more delegates to attend, it was decided to limit conference locations to North America and Europe. In January 2007, ISMB and ECCB agreed to hold joint conferences in Europe every other year, beginning with ISMB/ECCB 2007. ISMB would be held in North America in the years between joint meetings. As of 2016, this pattern has been confirmed to continue until at least 2019. ISMB/ECCB 2007 (held in Vienna, Austria) marked the first conference for which ISCB took full responsibility for organising. Vienna became the first city to host ISMB twice with ISMB/ECCB 2011. This 'return visit' was an experiment intended to reduce the increasing effort required to find suitable conference venues. Although the return to Vienna was only deemed partially successful due to price increases, Boston (which hosted ISMB 2010 and 2014) is predicted to become a 'safe' site which ISMB can periodically return to.

ISMB celebrated its 20th meeting with ISMB 2012, held in Long Beach, California. This event attracted around 1,600 delegates, submitting 268 scientific papers. Richard H. Lathrop and Lawrence Hunter presented a special keynote presentation, looking back at previous ISMB meetings and attempting to predict where the field of bioinformatics may head in the future. ISMB/ECCB 2013 was held in Berlin, Germany and was attended by around 2,000 delegates, submitting 233 scientific papers.

== Format ==
=== Main conference ===
The main ISMB conference is usually held over three days and consists of presentations, poster sessions and keynote talks.

Academic papers at ISMB were traditionally presented in a single track. Presentations at ISMB 1994 were split further into three themed days, focusing on protein secondary structure prediction, sequence analysis and AI techniques and biochemical applications, respectively. As attendance at ISMB increased, the single track approach became increasingly unsustainable and two parallel tracks were introduced at ISMB/ECCB 2004. Further expansion meant that, by ISMB 2012, over 200 talks were presented in nine parallel tracks including multiple proceedings tracks, a highlights track and a technology track. The introduction of parallel tracks to ISMB was controversial. Christopher Rawlings (head of Computational and Systems Biology at Rothamsted Research and organiser of ISMB 1995) has said: "There were a lot of people who wanted to keep it more strongly in the AI intelligent systems model and have a meeting where everybody would go to everything. But it just grew too big. We just couldn't." As the number of submitted proceedings papers has increased, the acceptance rate has decreased dramatically, from 75% in 1994 to 13% in 2012. ISMB proceedings from 1993-2000 were published by AAAI Press. Since ISMB 2001, proceedings have been published in the journal Bioinformatics. The number of posters presented at ISMB has also increased dramatically. 25 posters were presented at ISMB 1994; at recent ISMB meetings, 500–1,000 posters have been presented in multiple poster sessions.

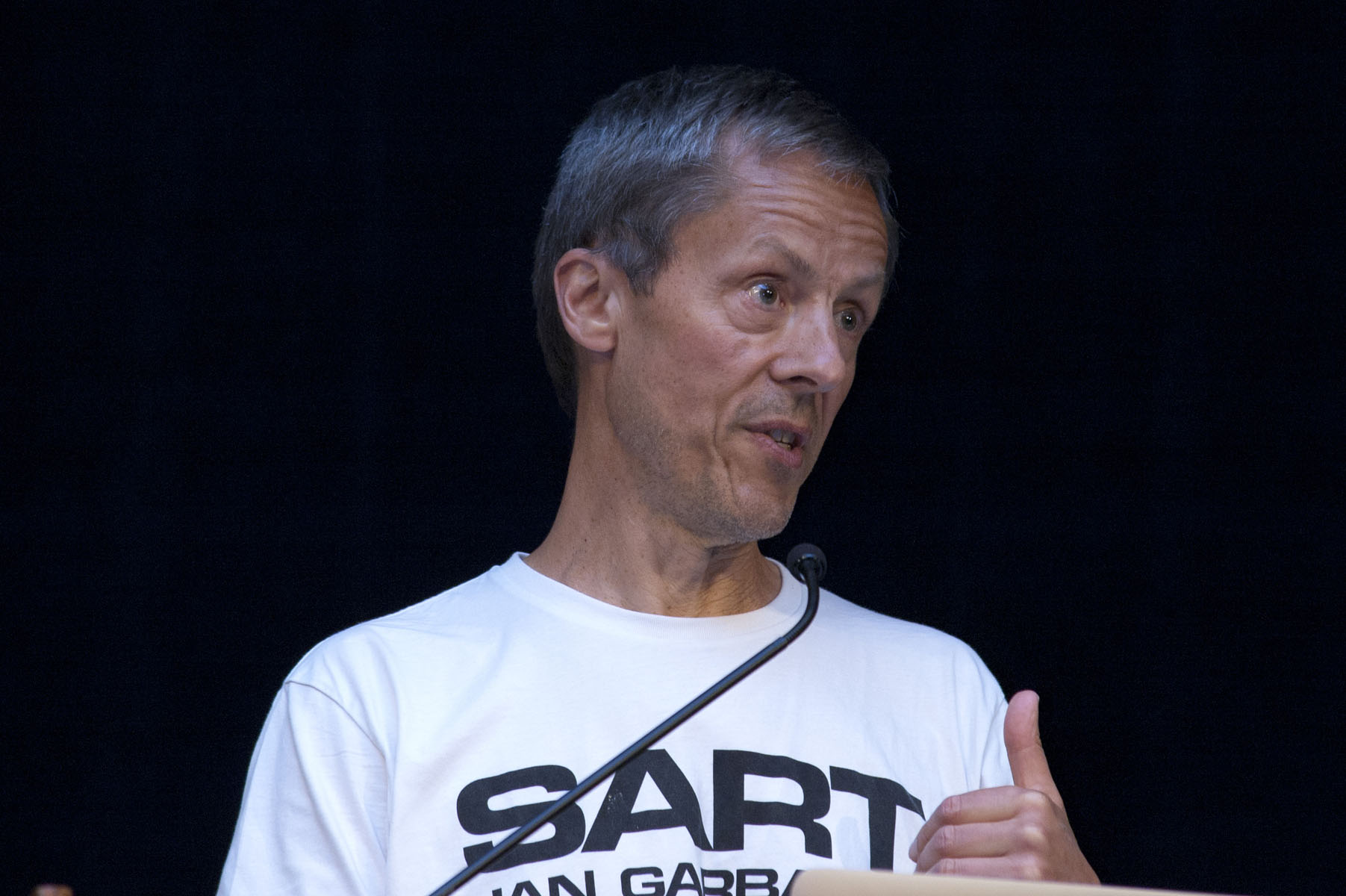
ISCB Accomplishment by a Senior Scientist Award winner Gunnar von Heijne giving his keynote talk at ISMB 2012.

Keynote talks are presented in a single track and generally attract the largest audience. These presentations are chosen to highlight outstanding research in the field of bioinformatics. Notable ISMB keynote speakers have included eight Nobel laureates: Richard J. Roberts (keynote speaker in 1994, 2006), John Sulston (1995), Manfred Eigen (1999), Gerald Edelman (2000), Sydney Brenner (2003), Kurt Wüthrich (2006), Robert Huber (2006) and Michael Levitt (2015).

As of 2012, ISMB runs on a budget in excess of $1.5M and, in terms of proceeds, brings in four times that of the other ISCB conferences (ISCB-Latin America, ISCB-Africa, ISCB-Asia, Rocky Mountain Bioinformatics Conference, CSHALS and the Great Lakes Bioinformatics Conference) combined. Standard registration fees (as of 2013) are around $1,000 for academics who are ISCB members ($1,350 for non-members), with lower rates for students and higher rates for corporate delegates respectively. Discounts are provided for early registration.

=== Satellite events ===
Pre-conference tutorials have played an important role in ISMB since the first conference. Tutorials at ISMB 1994 included introductions to genetic algorithms, neural networks, AI for molecular biologists and molecular biology for computer scientists. Tutorials on computational mass spectrometry-based proteomics and ENCODE data access were presented at ISMB/ECCB 2013.

As attendance at ISMB grew in the late 1990s, several satellite meetings and special interest group (SIG) meetings formed alongside the main conference. SIG meetings are held over one or two days before the main conference and focus on a specific topic, allowing more detailed discussion than there would be time for in the main conference. Notable SIG meetings include the Bioinformatics Open Source Conference (BOSC), which has been held annually since 2000 and Bio-Ontologies, which has been held annually since 1998. Satellite meetings are usually two days long and are held in conjunction with ISMB. The 12th CAMDA conference and the 9th 3DSIG meeting were held as satellite meetings of ISMB/ECCB 2013.

== List of conferences ==
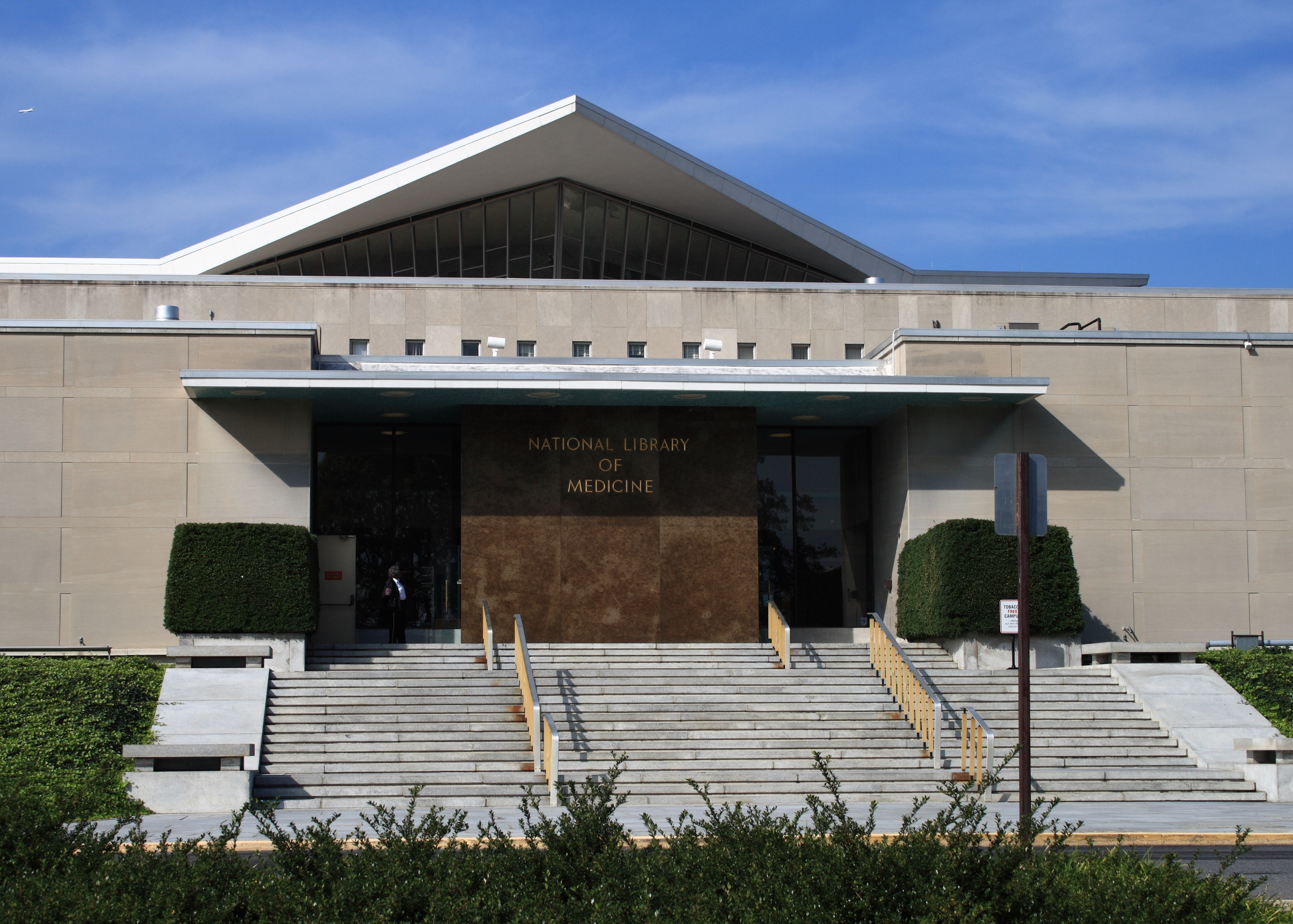
The first ISMB conference was held at the United States National Library of Medicine, Bethesda.

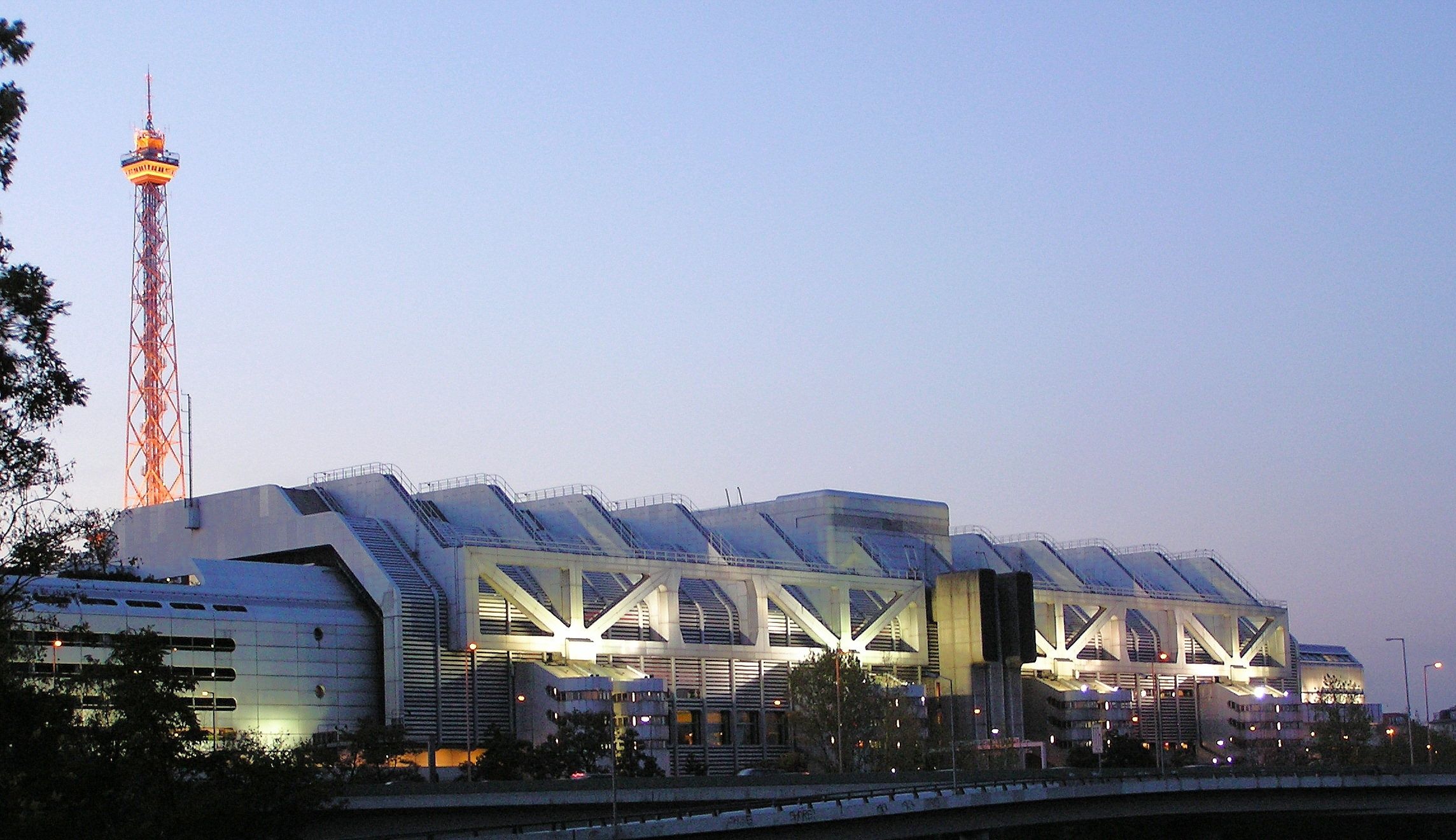
ISMB/ECCB 2013 was held at the Internationales Congress Centrum Berlin.

Conference	Location	Venue	Notes
ISMB 1993	Bethesda, United States	United States National Library of Medicine	
ISMB 1994	Stanford, United States	Stanford University	
ISMB 1995	Cambridge, United Kingdom	Robinson College, Cambridge	
ISMB 1996	St. Louis, United States	Washington University in St. Louis	
ISMB 1997	Halkidiki, Greece	Sithonia Beach Hotel, Porto Carras	
ISMB 1998	Montreal, Canada	Radisson Hotel des Gouverneurs	
ISMB 1999	Heidelberg, Germany	Kongresshaus Stadthalle Heidelberg	
ISMB 2000	San Diego, United States	University of California, San Diego	
ISMB 2001	Copenhagen, Denmark	Tivoli Gardens (Concert Hall)	
ISMB 2002	Edmonton, Canada	Shaw Conference Centre	
ISMB 2003	Brisbane, Australia	Brisbane Convention & Exhibition Centre	
ISMB/ECCB 2004	Glasgow, United Kingdom	Scottish Exhibition and Conference Centre	First joint meeting with ECCB.
ISMB 2005	Detroit, United States	Detroit Marriott at the Renaissance Center	
ISMB 2006	Fortaleza, Brazil	Fortaleza Convention Center	
ISMB/ECCB 2007	Vienna, Austria	Vienna International Centre	
ISMB 2008	Toronto, Canada	Toronto Convention Centre	
ISMB/ECCB 2009	Stockholm, Sweden	Stockholm International Fairs	
ISMB 2010	Boston, United States	John B. Hynes Veterans Memorial Convention Center	
ISMB/ECCB 2011	Vienna, Austria	Vienna International Centre	10th ECCB meeting.
ISMB 2012	Long Beach, United States	Long Beach Convention and Entertainment Center	20th ISMB meeting.
ISMB/ECCB 2013	Berlin, Germany	Internationales Congress Centrum Berlin	
ISMB 2014	Boston, United States	John B. Hynes Veterans Memorial Convention Center	
ISMB/ECCB 2015	Dublin, Ireland	Convention Centre Dublin	
ISMB 2016	Orlando, United States	Walt Disney World Swan and Dolphin Hotel and Convention Center	
ISMB/ECCB 2017	Prague, Czech Republic	Prague Congress Centre	25th ISMB meeting.
ISMB 2018	Chicago, United States	Hyatt Regency Hotel	
ISMB/ECCB 2019	Basel, Switzerland	Congress Center Basel	
ISMB 2020	Virtual Event		Originally meant to be in Montreal, Canada
ISMB/ECCB 2021	Virtual Event		Originally meant to be in Lyon, France
ISMB 2022	Madison, Wisconsin, United States	Monona Terrace Community and Convention Center	30th ISMB meeting.
ISMB/ECCB 2023	Lyon, France	Centre de Congrès de Lyon	
ISMB 2024	Montreal, Canada	Palais des congrès de Montréal	
ISMB/ECCB 2025	Liverpool, UK	ACC Liverpool	

=== Planned events ===
Conference	Location	Venue	Notes
ISMB 2026	Washington, D.C., United States		July 12–16
ISMB/ECCB 2027	Copenhagen, Denmark		July 18-22
ISMB 2028	Calgary, Alberta, Canada		July 23–27

== See also ==
- European Conference on Computational Biology (ECCB)
- Pacific Symposium on Biocomputing (PSB)
- Research in Computational Molecular Biology (RECOMB)
