= List of gene prediction software =

This is a list of software tools and web portals used for gene prediction.

Name	Description	Species	References
FINDER	Automated software package to annotate eukaryotic genes from RNA-Seq data and associated protein sequences	Eukaryotes	
FragGeneScan	Predicting genes in complete genomes and sequencing Reads	Prokaryotes, Metagenomes	
ATGpr	Identifies translational initiation sites in cDNA sequences	Human	
Prodigal	Its name stands for Prokaryotic Dynamic Programming Genefinding Algorithm. It is based on log-likelihood functions and does not use Hidden or Interpolated Markov Models.	Prokaryotes, Metagenomes (metaProdigal)	
AUGUSTUS	Eukaryote gene predictor	Eukaryotes	
BGF	Hidden Markov model (HMM) and dynamic programming based ab initio gene prediction program		
DIOGENES	Fast detection of coding regions in short genome sequences		
Dragon Promoter Finder	Program to recognize vertebrate RNA polymerase II promoters	Vertebrates	
EasyGene	The gene finder is based on a hidden Markov model (HMM) that is automatically estimated for a new genome.	Prokaryotes	
EuGene	Integrative gene finding	Prokaryotes, Eukaryotes	
FGENESH	HMM-based gene structure prediction: multiple genes, both chains	Eukaryotes	
FrameD	Find genes and frameshift in G+C rich prokaryote sequences	Prokaryotes, Eukaryotes	
GeMoMa	Homology-based gene prediction based on amino acid and intron position conservation as well as RNA-Seq data		
GENIUS II	Links ORFs in complete genomes to protein 3D structures	Prokaryotes, Eukaryotes	
geneid	Program to predict genes, exons, splice sites, and other signals along DNA sequences	Eukaryotes	
GeneParser	Parse DNA sequences into introns and exons	Eukaryotes	
GeneMark	Family of self-training gene prediction programs	Prokaryotes, Eukaryotes, Metagenomes	
GeneTack	Predicts genes with frameshifts in prokaryote genomes	Prokaryotes	
GenomeScan	Predicts the locations and exon-intron structures of genes in genome sequences from a variety of organisms, GENSCAN server is the GenomeScan's predecessor	Vertebrate, Arabidopsis, Maize	
GENSCAN	Predicts the locations and exon-intron structures of genes in genome sequences from a variety of organisms	Vertebrate, Arabidopsis, Maize	
GLIMMER	Finds genes in microbial DNA	Prokaryotes	
GLIMMERHMM	Eukaryotic gene-finding system	Eukaryotes	
GrailEXP	Predicts exons, genes, promoters, polyas, CpG islands, EST similarities, and repeat elements in DNA sequence	Human, Mus musculus, Arabidopsis thaliana, Drosophila melanogaster	
mGene	Support-vector machine (SVM) based system to find genes	Eukaryotes	
mGene.ngs	SVM based system to find genes using heterogeneous information: RNA-seq, tiling arrays	Eukaryotes	
MORGAN	Decision tree system to find genes in vertebrate DNA	Eukaryotes	
BioNIX	Web tool to combine results from different programs: GRAIL, FEX, HEXON, MZEF, GENEMARK, GENEFINDER, FGENE, BLAST, POLYAH, REPEATMASKER, TRNASCAN	Prokaryotes, Eukaryotes	
NNPP	Neural network promoter prediction	Prokaryotes, Eukaryotes	
NNSPLICE	Neural network splice site prediction	Drosophila, Human	
ORFfinder	Graphical analysis tool to find all open reading frames	Prokaryotes, Eukaryotes	
Regulatory Sequence Analysis Tools	Series of modular computer programs to detect regulatory signals in non-coding sequences	Fungi, Prokaryotes, Metazoa, Protist, Plants	
PHANOTATE	A tool to annotate phage genomes.	Phages	
SplicePredictor	Method to identify potential splice sites in (plant) pre-mRNA by sequence inspection using Bayesian statistical models	Eukaryotes	
VEIL	Hidden Markov model to find genes in vertebrate DNA Server	Eukaryotes	

== See also ==
- Gene prediction
- List of RNA structure prediction software
- Comparison of software for molecular mechanics modeling
