= Isochore =

Isochore may refer to:

- Isochore (genetics)
- Isochore map, in geology
- Isochore, in physics a line representing the variation of pressure with temperature when the volume of the substance operated on is constant.
  - iso-choric process, in thermodynamics
