= Gladiatorvirus jeffabunny =

Virus classification
- (unranked): Virus
- Realm: Duplodnaviria
- Kingdom: Heunggongvirae
- Phylum: Uroviricota
- Class: Caudoviricetes
- Genus: Gladiatorvirus
- Species: Gladiatorvirus jeffabunny

Synonyms
- Mycobacterium virus Jeffabunny; Mycobacterium phage Jeffabunny

Species of virus

Gladiatorvirus jeffabunny or Mycobacterium virus Jeffabunny is a bacteriophage known to infect bacterial species of the genus Mycobacterium. It was discovered by Jeffrey Rubin in 2008 in a Howard Hughes Medical Institute funded lab as part of SEA-PHAGES. It was taken from surface soil in a planter, in the shade of a non-redwood tree at Merrill College found infecting, specifically, Mycobacterium smegmatis.
