= Isochoric =

Isochoric may refer to:

- cell-transitive, in geometry
- isochoric process, a constant volume process in chemistry or thermodynamics
- Isochoric model
