= CGView =

Content
- Description: For visualizing circular genomes
- Data types captured: Data input: Genomic sequences with annotations in XML, tab delaminated format, or the NCBI ptt format. Data output: Static or interactive images of genomic maps.

Contact
- Research center: University of Alberta
- Laboratory: Paul Stothard and David S. Wishart
- Release date: 2004

Access
- Website: wishart.biology.ualberta.ca/cgview/xml_overview.html

Miscellaneous
- Data release frequency: Last updated on 2012

CGView (Circular Genome Viewer) is a freely available downloadable Java software program, applet and API (application programming interface) for generating colorful, zoomable, hyperlinked, richly annotated images of circular genomes such as bacterial chromosomes, mitochondrial DNA and plasmids. It is commonly used in bacterial sequence annotation pipelines to generate visual output suitable for the web. It has also been used in a variety of popular web servers (the CGView webserver, PlasMapper, BASys) and databases (BacMap).

== Overview ==
More than 4000 bacterial genomes and thousands of plasmid genomes have been sequenced thanks to the advance in DNA sequencing technology. CGView was developed to address the specialized needs for visualizing and annotating circular genomes, such as bacterial, plasmid, chloroplast, mitochondrial DNA sequences. Once installed, the CGView program accepts a number of different file formats where feature data and rendering information can be XML file, a tab delimited file, or an NCBI ptt file. CGView then converts the input into a graphical map in various (PNG, JPG, or SVG) image formats that can include labels, titles, legends and footnotes. The images can be static, interactive, or poster-sized images for printing or for embedding into web pages.

== Technology and Accessibility ==
CGView is written in the Java programming language. It is available as a downloadable Java application package as well as an applet and an API. The applet package can be used to embed interactive maps into web pages. The API can be used to incorporate CGView into another Java applications. A CGView server has recently been developed.

== See also ==
- Genomics
- Genome Browser
- BASys
- PlasMapper
