= Owen White =

Owen White may also refer to:

- Owen White (bioinformatician), American bioinformatician
- Owen White (baseball) (born 1995), American baseball player
