= Christopher Burge =

American scientist

Chris Burge
- Born: Christopher Boyce Burge; May 26, 1968 (age 58)
- Education: Stanford University
- Known for: GENSCAN
- Awards: Overton Prize; Searle Scholar Award
- Scientific career
- Workplaces: Massachusetts Institute of Technology
- Thesis: Identification of genes in human genomic DNA (1997)
- Doctoral advisor: Samuel Karlin
- Website: genes.mit.edu/burgelab/cburge.html

Christopher Boyce Burge (born May 26, 1968) is an American computational biologist and a Professor of Biology and Biological Engineering at Massachusetts Institute of Technology. He is known for his research on gene expression regulation, particularly RNA processing mechanisms like RNA splicing, polyadenylation, and microRNA-mediated regulation, using computational and experimental approaches.

== Education ==
Burge completed his Bachelor of Science at Stanford University in 1990, and continued graduate studies in computational biology at Stanford University, gaining his PhD in 1997 under the supervision of Samuel Karlin. During his time at Stanford he was responsible for developing algorithms for GENSCAN used in gene prediction for example the initial analysis of the Human Genome Project. His PhD thesis was titled Identification of genes in human genomic DNA.

== Research ==
From 1997 to 1999 Burge worked as a postdoc in the laboratory of Phillip Allen Sharp, working in the fields of RNA splicing and molecular evolution. Burge joined the Massachusetts Institute of Technology in 1999 as a Bioinformatics Fellow. He became Assistant Professor in 2002, Associate Professor in 2004, was tenured in 2006, and was promoted to full Professor in 2010. He has been an Associate Member of the Broad Institute since 2004. His current research interests include genomics, RNA splicing and microRNA regulation.

Burge has also served on the editorial boards of the academic journals RNA, PLOS Computational Biology, BMC Bioinformatics and BMC Genomics.

== Awards ==
In 2001 he was awarded the Overton Prize for Computational Biology by the International Society for Computational Biology. He was awarded a Searle Scholar Award in 2003 for his research in the computational biology of gene expression. In 2007 he was awarded the Schering-Plough Research Institute Award (now known as the ASBMB Young Investigator Award) by the American Society for Biochemistry and Molecular Biology for his outstanding research contributions to biochemistry and molecular biology.
