= Genomes OnLine Database =

International DNA sequencing resource

The Genomes OnLine Database (GOLD) is a web-based resource for comprehensive information regarding genome and metagenome sequencing projects, and their associated metadata, around the world. Since 2011, the GOLD database has been run by the DOE Joint Genome Institute

The GOLD database was created in 1997; the first version of the database contained information for 350 sequencing projects, of which 48 had been completely sequenced with their analyses published.

GOLD v.5 was released on 28 May 2014. As of 5 August 2015, the GOLD database contains information for 67,879 genome sequencing projects, of which 7,210 have been completed.

In order to facilitate comparative analysis between the information in GOLD and other databases (for example, GenBank and the EMBL), GOLD supports the minimum information standards metadata specifications recommended by the Genomic Standards Consortium, in particular, the MIxS (Minimum Information about any (x) Sequence) specification. GOLD also allows the annotation of genomes or metagenomes using the DOE JGI Integrated Microbial Genomes System and has links to the BioMed Central journal Standards in Genomic Sciences, allowing (meta)genomic data to be published.

== See also ==
- MicrobesOnline
