= Pseudogene (database) =

Pseudogene.org

Content
- Description: pseudogene annotation.

Contact
- Primary citation: Karro & al. (2007)
- Release date: 2006

Access
- Website: http://www.pseudogene.org

Pseudogene is a database of pseudogenes annotations compiled from various sources.

== See also ==
- Gene prediction
- Glossary of genetics
- Index of molecular biology articles
