= MicrobesOnline =

An overview of the core components of the MicrobesOnline site

MicrobesOnline is a publicly and freely accessible website that hosts multiple comparative genomic tools for comparing microbial species at the genomic, transcriptomic and functional levels. MicrobesOnline was developed by the Virtual Institute for Microbial Stress and Survival, which is based at the Lawrence Berkeley National Laboratory in Berkeley, California. The site was launched in 2005, with regular updates until 2011.

The main aim of MicrobesOnline is to provide an easy-to-use resource that integrates a wealth of data from multiple sources. This integrated platform facilitates studies in comparative genomics, metabolic pathway analysis, genome composition, functional genomics as well as in protein domain and family data. It also provides tools to search or browse the database with genes, species, sequences, orthologous groups, gene ontology (GO) terms or pathway keywords, etc. Another one of its main features is the Gene Cart, which allows users to keep a record of their genes of interest. One of the highlights of the database is the overall navigation accessibility and interconnection between the tools.

== Background ==
The development of high-throughput methods for genome sequencing has brought about a wealth of data that requires sophisticated bioinformatics tools for their analysis and interpretation. Nowadays, numerous tools exist to study genomics sequence data and extract information from different perspectives. However, the lack of unification of nomenclature and standardised protocols between tools, makes direct comparison between their results very difficult. Additionally, the user is forced to constantly switch from various websites or software, adjusting the format of their data to fit with individual requirements. MicrobesOnline was developed with the aim to integrate the capacities of different tools into a unified platform for easy comparison between analysis results, with a focus on prokaryote species and basal eukaryotes.

== Species included in the database ==
MicrobesOnline hosts genomic, gene expression and fitness data for a wide range of microbial species. Genomic data is available for 1752 bacteria, 94 archaea and 119 eukaryotes, for a total of 3707 genomes, 2842 of which are marked as being complete. Gene expression data is available for 113 species, and fitness data is available for 4 organisms.

== Functions and Site Architecture ==
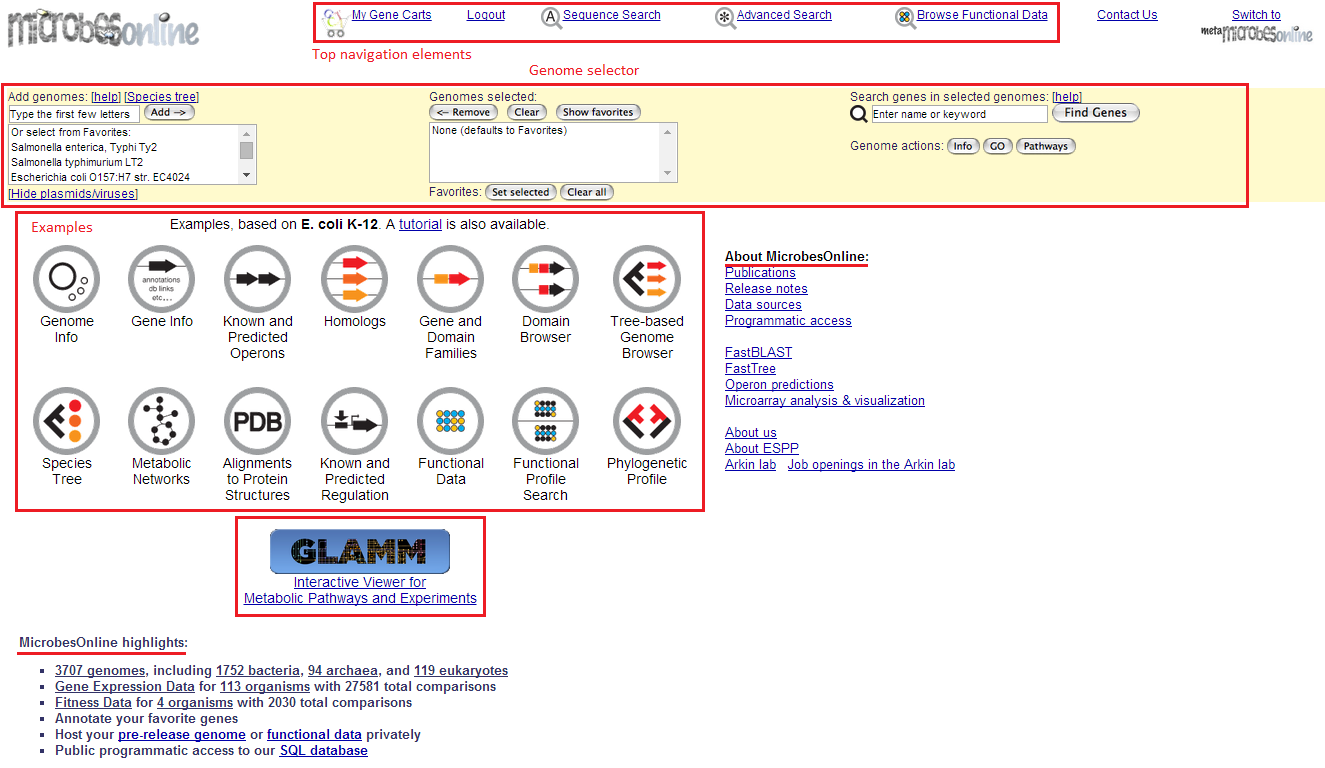
The homepage of MicrobesOnline with six major sections for accessing the database highlighted.

MicrobesOnline provides diverse tools for searching, analysing and integrating information related to bacteria genomes for applications in four major areas: genetic information, functional genomics, comparative genomics and metabolic pathway studies. The homepage of MicrobesOnline is the portal for accessing its functions, which includes six main sections: the top navigation elements, a genome selector, examples of the tutorial based on E.coli K-12, a link to the Genome-Linked Application for Metabolic Maps (GLAMM), website highlights and the "about MicrobesOnline" list. As an ongoing project, the authors of MicrobesOnline claim that the tools for data analysis and the support of more data types will be expanded.

=== Genetic information ===
Information of microbial genes stored in MicrobesOnline includes sequences (genes, transcripts and proteins), genomic loci, gene annotations and some statistics of sequences. This information can be accessed through three features displayed on the homepage of MicrobesOnline: sequence search and advanced search in the top navigation section, and the genome selector. For the sequence search tool, MicrobesOnline integrates BLAT, FastHMM and FastBLAST to search protein sequences, and uses MEGABLAST to search nucleotide sequences. It also provides a link to BLAST as an alternative way for searching sequences. On the other hand, the advanced search tool enables a user to search genetic information by categories, custom query, wild-card search and field-specific search, which uses the gene name, the description, the cluster of orthologous groups (COGs) id, the GO term, the KEGG enzyme commission (EC) number, etc. as key words.

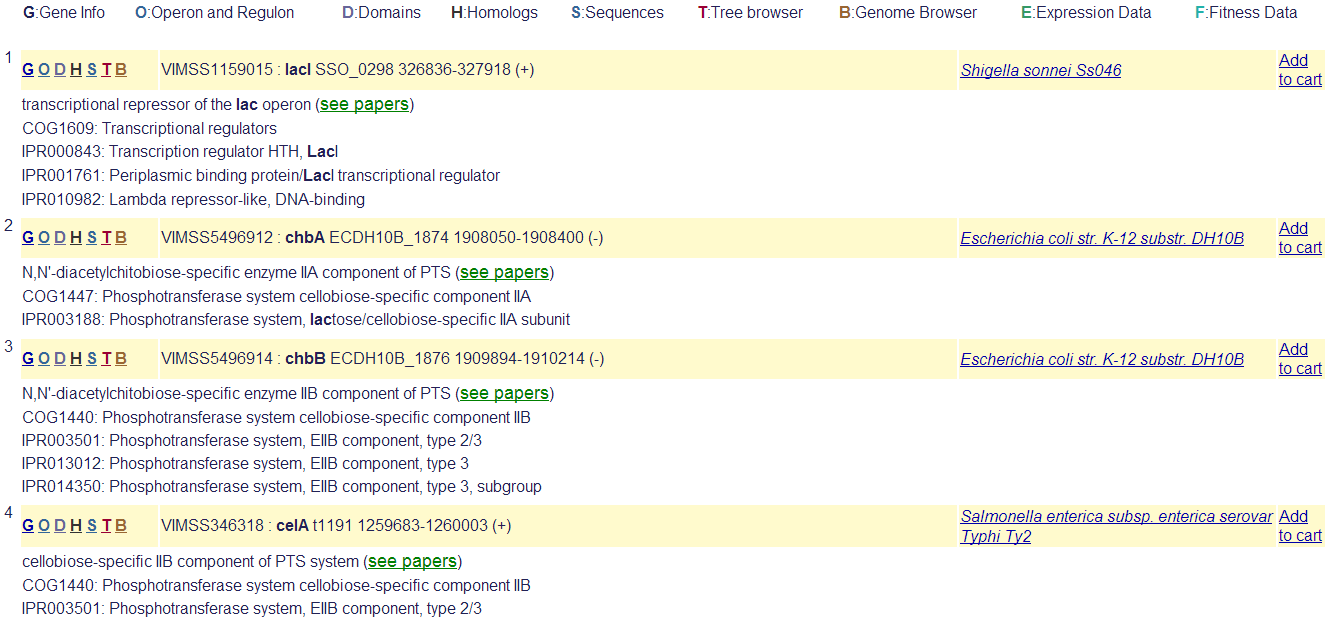
An example of the gene list view

The "genomes selected" box of the genome selector lists genomes added from the favourite genome list on the left or the ones searched by keywords. On the right side of the genome selector, four actions can be applied after selecting genomes: the "find genes" interface searches the gene name in the selected genomes and displays results in the gene list view; the "info" button lists a brief summary of selected genomes in the Summary View; the "GO" button opens a GO Browser called VertiGo which tabulates the number of genes under different GO items; finally, the "pathway" button initiates a pathway browser that illustrates the complete pathways of all organisms in the MicrobesOnline database.

In addition, the genome names shown in the summary view leads to a single-genome data view that presents a wealth of information about the selected genome. In the gene list view, the links "G O D H S T B..." lead the user to a locus information tool, where detailed information such as operon & regulon, domains & families, sequences, annotations, etc. are shown.

==== Gene carts ====
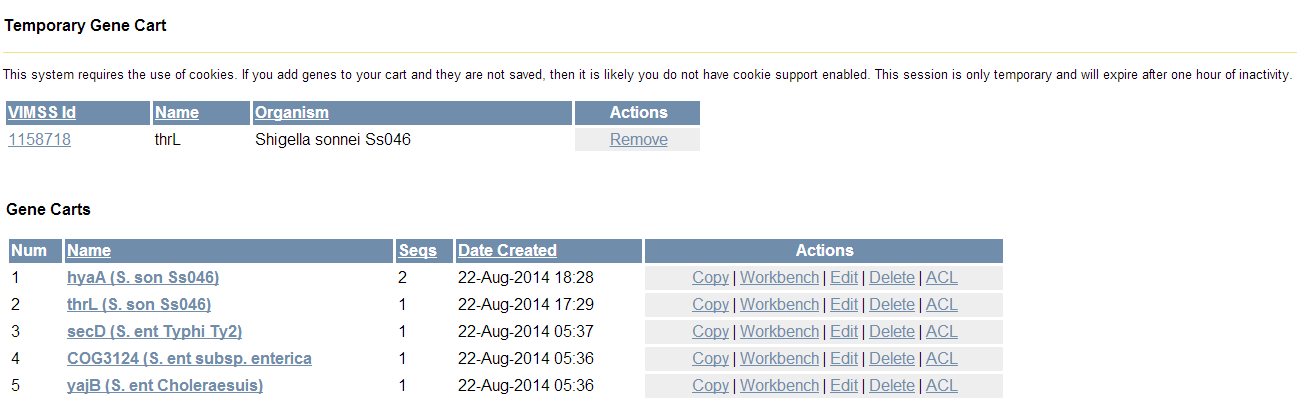
A custom demonstration of the temporary gene cart and the permanent gene cart.

An important feature to store a user's work is the Gene Cart. Many web pages of MicrobesOnline displaying genetic information contain a link to add genes of interest to the session gene cart, which is available for all users. This is a temporary gene cart, and as such it loses information as a user closes the web browser. Genes in the session gene cart can be saved to the permanent gene cart which is only available to registered users after logging in.

=== Functional genomics ===
One goal of setting up MicrobesOnline is to store functional information of microbial genomes. Such information includes gene ontology and microarray-based gene expression profiles, which can be accessed through two interfaces called GO browser and Expression Data Viewer respectively. The GO browser provides links to genes organised by gene ontology terms and the Expression Data Viewer provides both the access to expression profiles and information of experimental conditions.

==== Gene ontology hierarchy ====
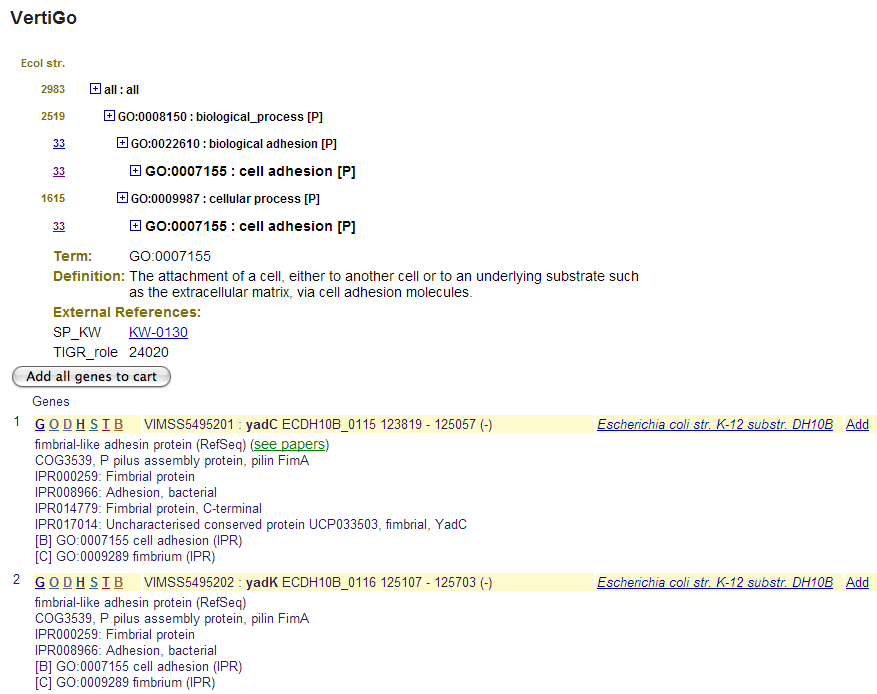
Genes of E.coli K-12 substrain DH10B under the highlighted GO item "cell adhesion".

The GO Browser, also known as VertiGo, is used by MicrobesOnline to search and visualise the GO hierarchy, which is a unified verbal system that describes properties of gene products, including cellular components, molecular function and biological process. The Genome Selector of the MicrobesOnline homepage provides a direct way to browse the GO hierarchy of the selected genomes, as well as provide a list of genes under a selected GO term, which can then be added to the session gene cart for further analysis.

==== Gene expression information ====
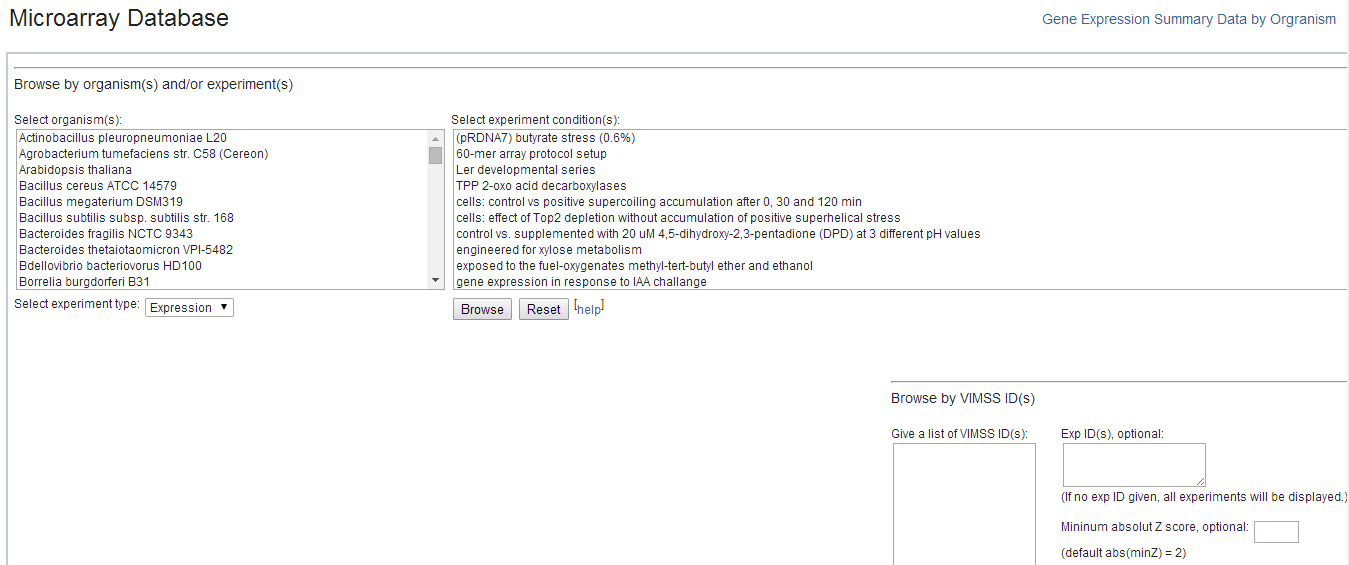
The experiment browser as a component of the Expression Data Viewer.

The Expression Data Viewer is an interface for searching and inspecting microarray-base gene expression experiments and expression profiles. It consists of several components: an experiment browser for searching specific experiments in selected genomes under selected experimental conditions, an expression experiment viewer providing details of each microarray experiment, a gene expression viewer showing a heat map of the expression levels of the selected gene and genes in the same operon, and finally, a profile search tool for searching gene expression profiles. The Expression Data Viewer can be accessed through three ways: the "Browse Functional Data" in the navigator bar, the "Gene Expression Data" in the homepage and the "Gene expression" list in the single-genome data view, where the expression data are available. The single-genome data view can also show a protein-protein interaction browser that allows the inspection of interaction complexes and the download of expression data (e.g. Escherichia coli str. K-12 substr. MG1655). Furthermore, the user can launch a MultiExperiment Viewer (MeV) in the single-genome data view for analysing and visualising expression data.

=== Comparative genomics ===
MicrobesOnline stores information of gene homology and phylogeny for comparative genomic studies, which can be accessed through two interfaces. The first one is the Tree Browser, which draws a species tree or a gene tree for the selected gene and its gene neighbourhood. The second one is the Orthology Browser, which is an extension of the Genome Browser and demonstrates the selected gene within the context of its gene neighbourhood aligned with orthologs in other selected genomes. Both browsers provide options to save a gene in the session gene cart for further analysis.

==== Tree browser ====
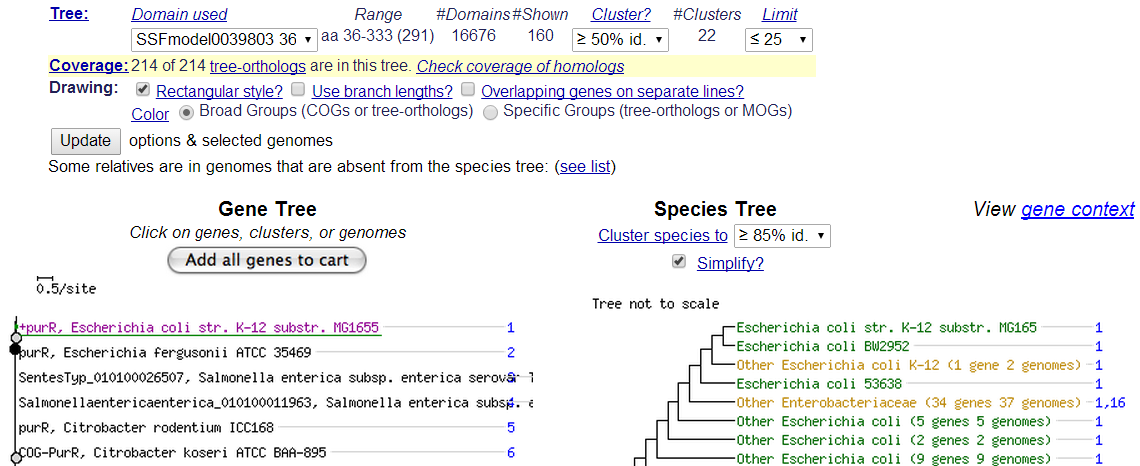
A species tree view in rectangular style

The tree browser can be accessed by searching a gene by the Find Genes tool on the homepage with its VIMSS id (e.g. VIMSS15779). Once the gene context view has been accessed through the "Browse genomes by trees" option, a gene tree and a gene context diagram are displayed. In addition, the "View species tree" option opens a species tree view, which shows a species tree alongside the gene tree. Additionally, the tree browser enables users to choose both genes and genomes according to their similarity. Furthermore, it also demonstrates horizontal gene transfers among genomes.

==== Orthology browser ====
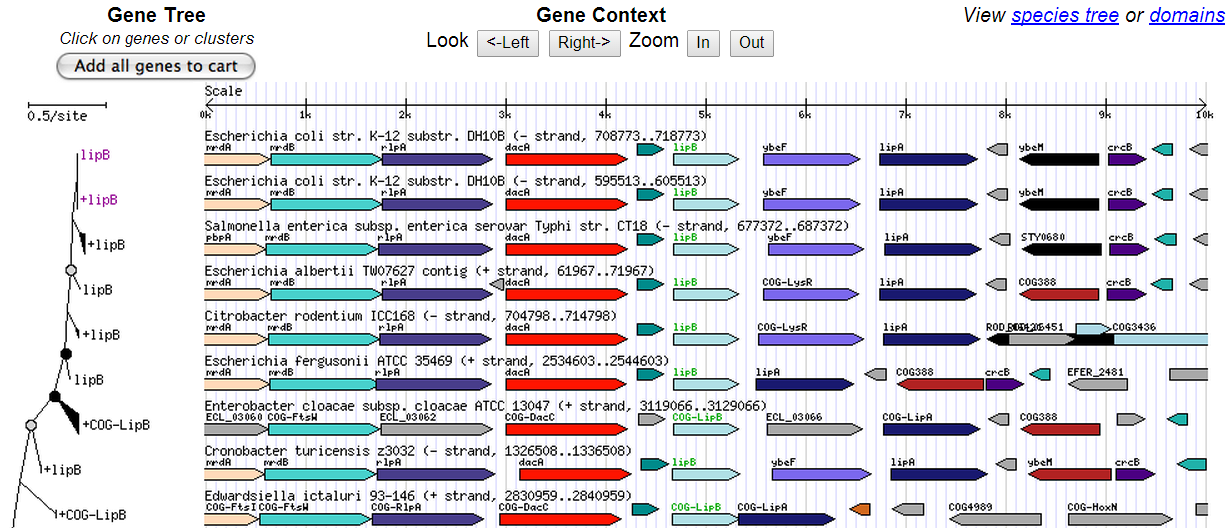
A gene context view, which shows the contexts of genomes beside a gene tree.

The Orthology Browser displays orthologs of genomes compared to the query genome by choosing multiple genomes from the "Select Organism(s) to Display" box.

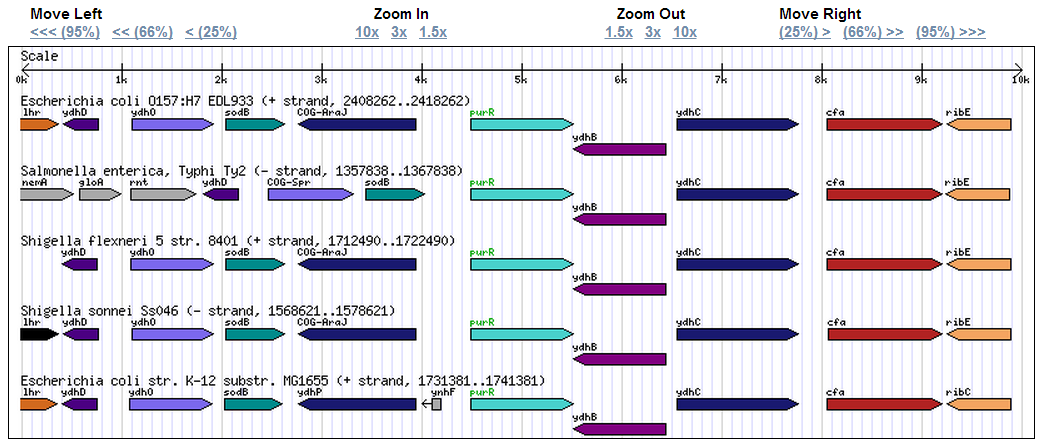
The orthology around VIMSS ID 15779 of five given genomes displayed in the Orthology Browser.

The locus information can be viewed through the "view genes" option, and this gene can be added to the session gene cart, or its gene expression data (including the heatmap) can be downloaded. Alternatively, a gene context view appears when browsing genomes by trees.

=== Metabolic pathway information ===
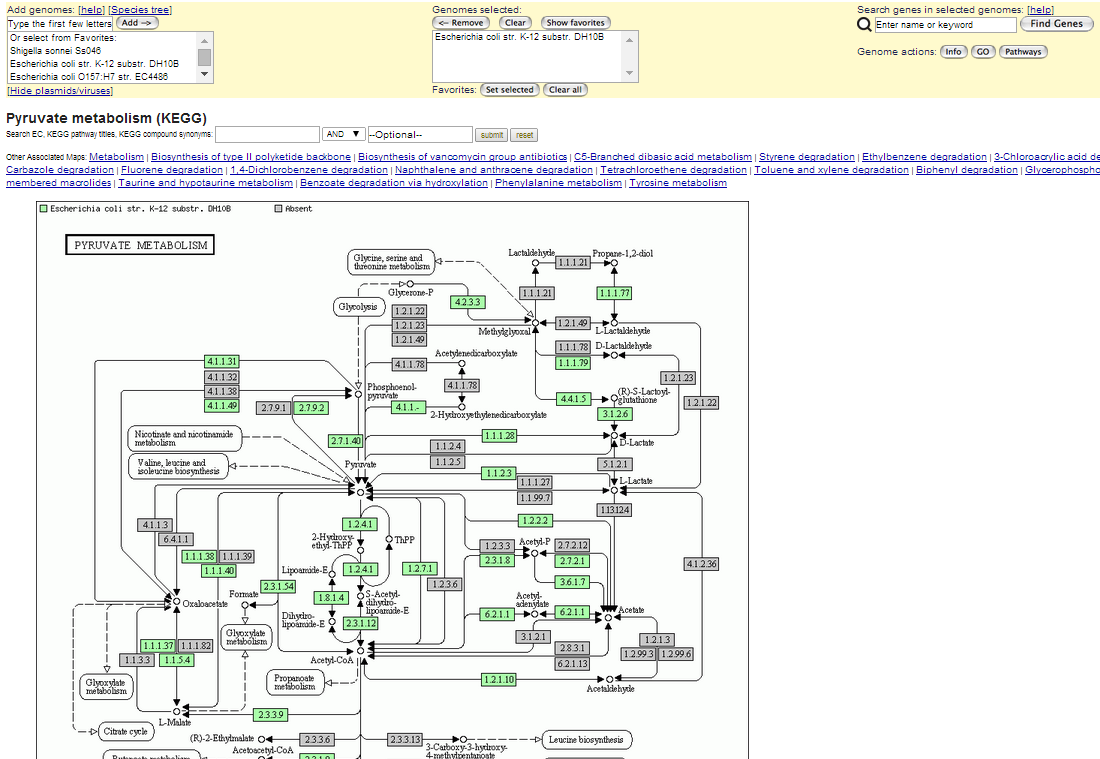
The pyruvate metabolism pathway illustrated by the Pathway Browser.

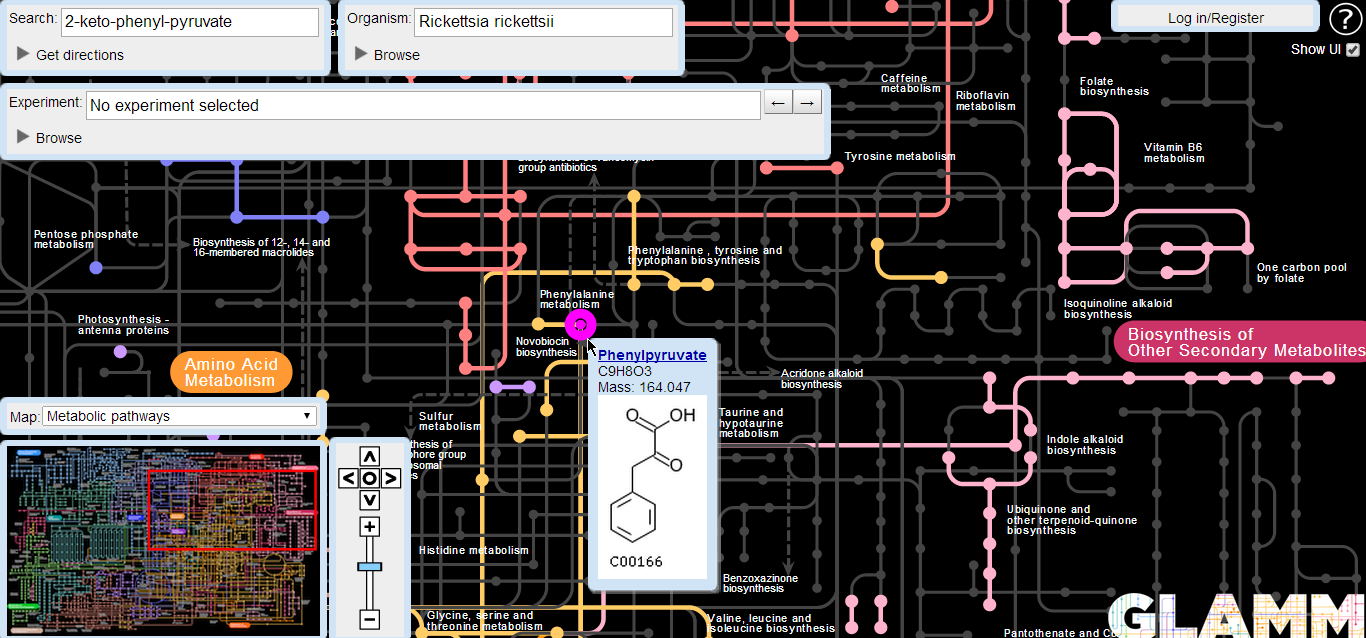
The KEGG pathway map of Rickettsia rickettsii is visualised by GLAMM with a metabolite highlighted.

The Pathway Browser lets users to navigate the Kyoto Encyclopedia of Genes and Genomes (KEGG) pathway maps displaying predicted presence or absence of enzymes for up to two selected genomes. The map of a particular pathway and a comparison between two kinds of microbes can be shown in the pathway browser. The enzyme commission number (e.g. 3.1.3.25) provides a link to the gene list view that shows information of the selected enzyme and allows the user to add genes to the session gene cart.

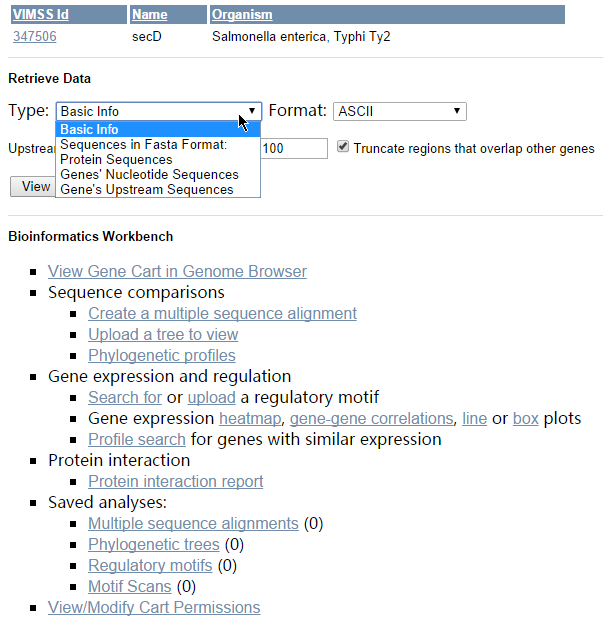
The layout of Bioinformatics Workbench

The GLAMM is another tool for searching and visualising metabolic pathways in a unified web interface. It helps users to identify or construct novel, transgenic pathways.

=== Bioinformatics ===
MicrobesOnline has integrated numerous tools for analysing sequences, gene expression profiles and protein-protein interactions into an interface called Bioinformatics Workbench, which is accessed via gene carts. Analyses currently supported include multiple sequence alignments, construction of phylogenetic trees, motif searches and scans, summaries of gene expression profiles and protein-protein interactions. In order to save computational resources, a user is allowed to run two concurrent jobs for at most four hours and all results are saved temporarily until the session is terminated. Results can be shared with other users or groups via the resource access control tool.

== Supporting databases ==
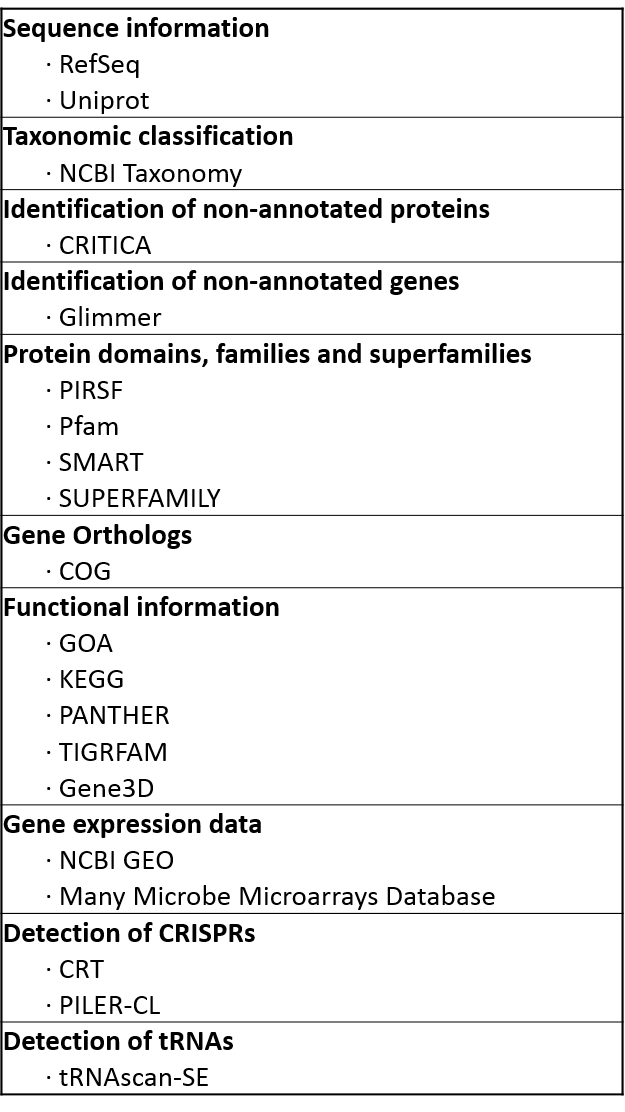
A summary of the databases of MicrobesOnline

MicrobesOnline is built on the integration of the data of an array of databases that manage different aspects of its capabilities. A comprehensive list is as follows:

- Sequence information: Non-redundant protein, gene and transcript sequences and annotations are extracted from RefSeq and Uniprot.
- Taxonomic classification of species and sequences: NCBI Taxonomy is used to classify the species and sequences into phylogenetic groups, and build a phylogenetic tree.
- Identification of non-annotated proteins from sequences: CRITICA is used to finds stretches of DNA sequence that code for proteins. Both a comparative genomics and a comparison and annotation-independent method are used.
- Identification of non-annotated genes from sequences: MicrobesOnline relies on Glimmer to automatically find genes in bacteria, archaea and viral sequences.
- Classification of proteins: The classification of proteins by their conserved domain, family and superfamilies determined by PIRSF, Pfam, SMART and SUPERFAMILY repositories are included.
- Gene Orthology information: The orthologous groups of genes across species are based on the information on the COG database, which relies on protein sequence comparison for the detection of homology.
- Functional information of genes and proteins: The range of functional information provided is contributed by the following: GOA for Gene Ontology annotation of genes into functional categories, KEGG for metabolic, molecular and signaling pathways of genes, and PANTHER for information about molecular and functional pathways, in the context of the relationships between protein families and their evolution . TIGRFAMs and Gene3D are referred to for structural information and annotation of proteins.
- Gene expression data: Both NCBI GEO and Many Microbe Microarrays Database support the gene expression data of MicrobesOnline. The datasets compiled by Many Microbe Microarrays Database have the added advantage of being directly comparable, since only data generated by single-channel Affymetrix microarrays are accepted, and are subsequently normalised.
- Detection of CRISPRs: CRISPR are DNA loci involved in the immunity against invasive sequences, where short direct repeats are separated by spacer sequences. The databases generated by the CRT and PILER-CL algorithms are used to detect CRISPRs.
- Detection of tRNAs: The tRNAscan-SE database is used as a reference to identify tRNA sequences.
- Submission of data by users: Users have the capacity of uploading both genomes and expression files to MicrobesOnline and analyse them with the analysis tools offered, with the option of keeping the data private (in the case of unpublished data) or releasing it to the public. Microarray data should include a clear identification of the organisms, platforms, treatments and controls, experimental conditions, time points and normalization techniques used, as well as the expression data in either log ratio or log levels format. Although draft genome sequences are accepted, they must be compliant with certain guidelines: (1) the assembled genome must have less than 100 scaffolds, (2) the FASTA file format should be used, having a unique label per contig, (3) preferably gene predictions should be present (in this case, accepted formats include GenBank, EMBL, tab-delimited and FASTA), (4) the name of the genome and the NCBI taxonomy ID should be provided.

== Updates ==
MicrobesOnline was updated every 3 to 9 months from 2007 to 2011, where new features as well as new species data were added. However, there have been no new release notes since March 2011.

== Compatibility with other sites ==
MicrobesOnline is compatible with other similar platforms of integrated microbe data, such as IMG and RegTransBase, given that standard identifiers of genes are maintained throughout the database.

== MicrobesOnline in the realm of microbe analysis platforms ==
There have been other efforts to create a unified platform for prokaryote analysis tools, however, most of them focus on one set of analysis types. A few examples of these focused databases include those with an emphasis on metabolic data analysis (Microme ), comparative genomics (MBGD and the OMA Browser), regulons and transcription factors (RegPrecise), comparative functional genomics (Pathline), among many others. However, notable efforts have been made by other teams to create comprehensive platforms that largely overlap with the capabilities of MicrobesOnline. MicroScope and the Integrated Microbial Genomes System (IMG) are examples of popular and recently updated databases (As of September 2014).

== Extension of metagenome analysis: metaMicrobesOnline ==
metaMicrobesOnline was compiled by the same developers as MicrobesOnline, and constitutes an extension of MicrobesOnline capacities, by focusing on the phylogenetic analysis of metagenomes. With a similar web interface to MicrobesOnline, the user is capable of toggling between sites via the "switch to" link on the homepage.

== See also ==
- Integrated Microbial Genomes System (IMG)
- BLAST
- BLAT (bioinformatics)
- FASTA format
- Gene ontology
- Hidden Markov model (HMM)
- Homology (biology)
- KEGG
- Multiple Sequence Alignment
