= Graham Hatfull =

American-English professor

Graham F. Hatfull
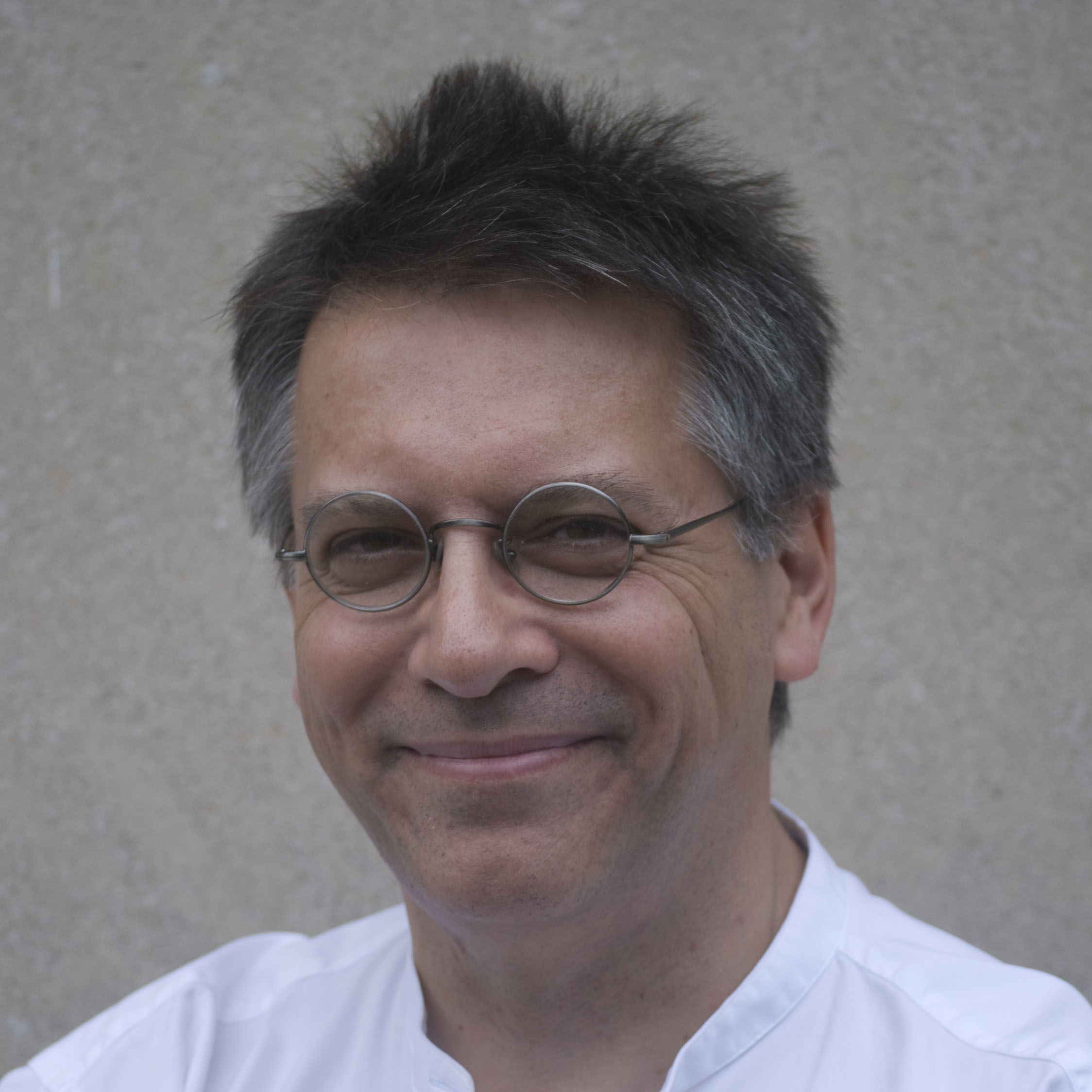
- Graham Hatfull
- Born: August 22, 1957 (age 69); Maidstone, Kent, England
- Citizenship: US, UK
- Education: Westfield College, University of London; University of Edinburgh
- Scientific career
- Fields: Bacteriophage biology, Microbiology
- Workplaces: Yale University; MRC Laboratory of Molecular Biology; University of Pittsburgh
- Doctoral advisor: Willie Donachie
- Website: http://hatfull.org

Graham F. Hatfull is the Eberly Family Professor of Biotechnology at the University of Pittsburgh, where he studies bacteriophages. He has been an HHMI professor since 2002, and is the creator of their SEA-PHAGES program. In 2024, he was elected as a permanent member of the National Academy of Sciences.

== Life and career ==
Hatfull studied biological sciences at Westfield College, University of London from 1975 to 1978. He received his PhD from the University of Edinburgh in 1981. He did postdoctoral research at Yale University and the Medical Research Council.

In 2002, he developed the SEA-PHAGES, originally the PHIRE (Phage Hunters Integrating Research and Education) program, which he originally developed to include 10-12 students per year. The program existed only at the University of Pittsburgh from 2002 to 2008, when the HHMI created the Science Education Alliance Phage Hunters Advancing Genomics and Evolutionary Science (SEA-PHAGES) program. The first year of SEA-PHAGES, the program had 12 participative universities. The program has since spread to more than 100 universities and thousands of students per year, with more than 50,000 total students having participated by 2025.

Much of Hatfull's research focuses on understanding and characterizing bacteriophages, which has led to using phage therapies to treat Mycobacterium infections in some patients.

== Honors ==
Hatfull is a member of the American Academy of Microbiology, a fellow of the American Association for the Advancement of Science, and in 2020 became a member of the American Academy of Arts & Sciences.

He is also the winner of the 2013 Carski Foundation Distinguished Undergraduate Teaching Award and the 2020 Peter Wildy Prize.

In 2024, Hatfull was elected to the National Academy of Sciences. According to the Academy "[members] are elected to the National Academy of Sciences in recognition of their distinguished and continuing achievements in original research. Membership is a widely accepted mark of excellence in science and is considered one of the highest honors that a scientist can receive. Current NAS membership totals approximately 2,400 members and 500 international members, of which approximately 190 have received Nobel prizes." He was elected a Fellow of the Royal Society in 2025.
