= PlasMapper =

Content
- Description: Plasmid mapping server
- Data types captured: Data input: Plasmid sequence (FASTA format); Data output: Text and image map of plasmid (PNG, JPG and SVG)

Contact
- Research center: University of Alberta
- Laboratory: David S. Wishart
- Primary citation: PlasMapper: a web server for drawing and auto-annotating plasmid maps.

Access
- Website: http://wishart.biology.ualberta.ca/PlasMapper/
- Download URL: http://wishart.biology.ualberta.ca/PlasMapper/

Miscellaneous
- Curation policy: Manually curated

PlasMapper (Plasmid Mapper) is a freely available web server that automatically generates and annotates high-quality circular plasmid maps. It is a particularly useful online service for molecular biologists wishing to generate plasmid maps without having to purchase or maintain expensive, commercial software. PlasMapper accepts plasmid/vector DNA sequence as input (FASTA format) and uses sequence pattern matching and BLAST sequence alignment to automatically identify and label common promoters, terminators, cloning sites, restriction sites, reporter genes, affinity tags, selectable marker genes, origins of replication and open reading frames. PlasMapper then reformats and presents the identified features in both a simple textual form and as high-resolution, multicolored image.

The appearance and content of the output can be customized in numerous ways using a variety of online options. PlasMapper images can be rendered in both rasterized (Portable Network Graphics (PNG) and JPG) and scalable vector graphics (SVG) formats to accommodate a variety of user needs or preferences. The images and textual output are of sufficient quality that they may be used directly in publications or presentations.

== PlasMapper 3.0 ==
The third iteration of PlasMapper was published on 26th April, 2023. This version includes massive overhaul to its visual genome and sequence editors, while also adding new features such as the PlasMapDB, codon optimization using Optipyzer, and BLAST capabilities, making it a one-stop shop for synthetic biologists specifically.

== See also ==
- Plasmid
- Restriction map
- Vector (molecular biology)
- CGView

== Other Software ==
- Atlas Plasmid Mapper
