= Integrated Microbial Genomes System =

Genome browsing and annotation platform

IMG
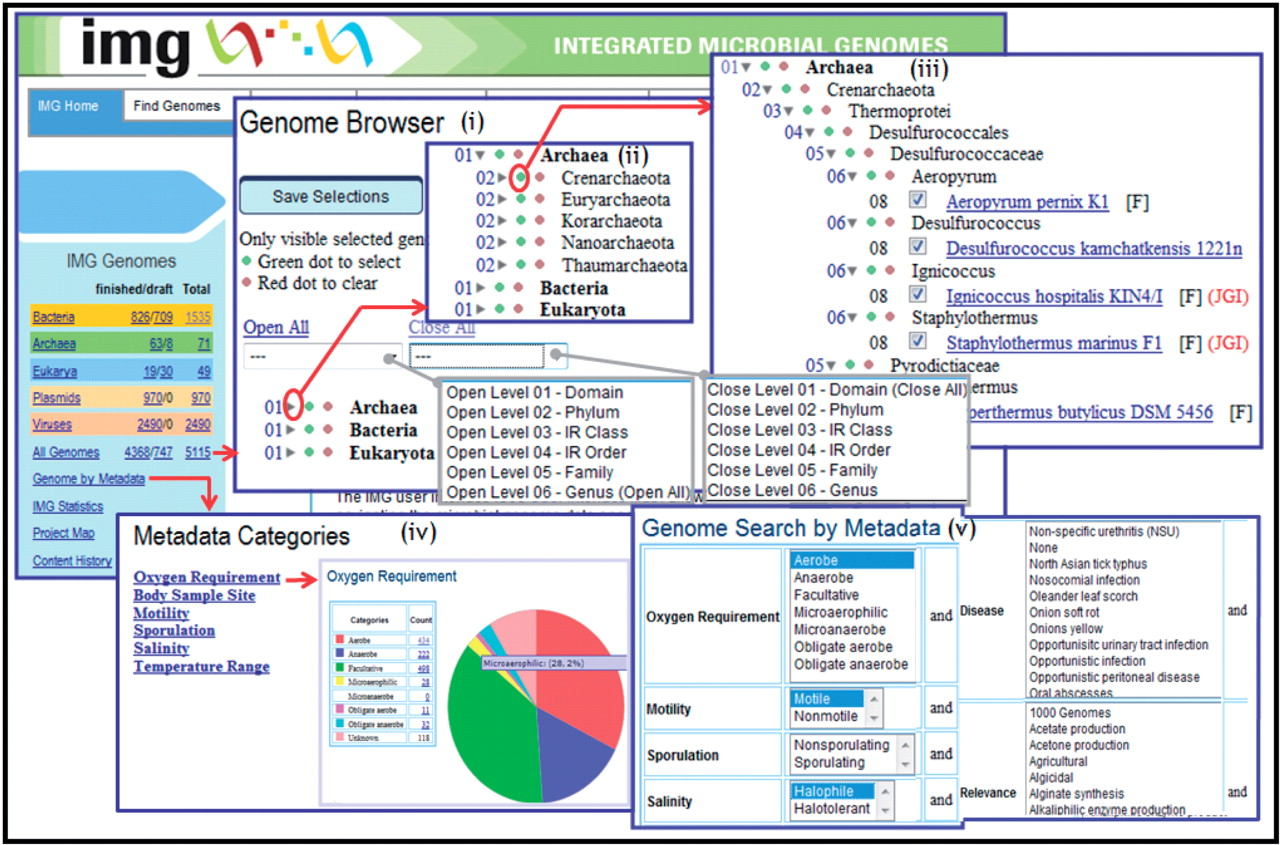
- Genome analysis tools in IMG 2.9

Content
- Description: Integrated microbial genomes database and comparative analysis system

Contact
- Authors: Victor M Markowitz
- Primary citation: Markowitz et al. (2012)

Access
- Website: img.jgi.doe.gov

The Integrated Microbial Genomes (IMG) system is a genome browsing and annotation platform developed by the U.S. Department of Energy (DOE)-Joint Genome Institute. IMG contains all the draft and complete microbial genomes sequenced by the DOE-JGI integrated with other publicly available genomes (including Archaea, Bacteria, Eukarya, Viruses and Plasmids). IMG provides users a set of tools for comparative analysis of microbial genomes along three dimensions: genes, genomes and functions. Users can select and transfer them in the comparative analysis carts based upon a variety of criteria. IMG also includes a genome annotation pipeline that integrates information from several tools, including KEGG, Pfam, InterPro, and the Gene Ontology, among others. Users can also type or upload their own gene annotations (called MyIMG gene annotations) and the IMG system will allow them to generate Genbank or EMBL format files containing these annotations.

In successive releases IMG has expanded to include several domain-specific tools. The Integrated Microbial Genomes with Microbiome Samples (IMG/M) system is an extension of the IMG system providing a comparative analysis context of assembled metagenomic data with the publicly available isolate genomes. The Integrated Microbial Genomes- Expert Review (IMG/ER) system provides support to individual scientists or group of scientists for functional annotation and curation of their microbial genomes of interest. Users can submit their annotated genomes (or request the IMG automated annotation pipeline to be applied first) into IMG-ER and proceed with manual curation and comparative analysis in the system, through secure (password protected) access. The IMG-HMP is focused on analysis of genomes related to the Human Microbiome Project (HMP) in the context of all publicly available genomes in IMG. The IMG-ABC system is a system for bacterial secondary metabolism analysis and targeted biosynthetic gene cluster discovery. The IMG-VR system (with the recent updated version IMG/VR v.2.0) is the largest publicly available database for viral genomes and metagenomes.

== See also ==
- Genomes OnLine Database
- Genomics
- Metagenomics
- MicrobesOnline
