= BacMap =

Content
- Description: A database of annotated bacterial genomes and their chromosome/genome maps
- Data types captured: Gene sequence data, protein sequence data, general gene and protein annotation, gene positions, general genome/proteome statistics, taxonomic and phenotypic information, bacterial chromosome maps (images)

Contact
- Research center: University of Alberta
- Laboratory: David S. Wishart

Access
- Website: http://wishart.biology.ualberta.ca/BacMap/ (version 1.0); http://bacmap.wishartlab.com/ (version 2.0)

Miscellaneous
- Data release frequency: Updated every 2-3 months
- Curation policy: Manually curated

BacMap is a freely available web-accessible database containing fully annotated, fully zoomable and fully searchable chromosome maps from more than 2500 prokaryotic (archaebacterial and eubacterial) species. BacMap was originally developed in 2005 to address the challenges of viewing and navigating through the growing numbers of bacterial genomes that were being generated through large-scale sequencing efforts. Since it was first introduced, the number of bacterial genomes in BacMap has grown by more than 15X. Essentially BacMap functions as an on-line visual atlas of microbial genomes. All of the genome annotations in BacMap were generated through the BASys genome annotation system. BASys is a widely used microbial annotation infrastructure that performs comprehensive bioniformatic analyses on raw (or labeled) bacterial genome sequence data. All of the genome (chromosome) maps in BacMap were constructed using the program known as CGView. CGView is a popular visualization program for generating interactive, web-compatible circular chromosome maps (Fig. 1). Each chromosome map in BacMap is extensively hyperlinked and each chromosome image can be interactively navigated, expanded and rotated using navigation buttons or hyperlinks. All identified genes in a BacMap chromosome map are colored according to coding directions and when sufficiently zoomed-in, gene labels are visible. Each gene label on a BacMap genome map is also hyperlinked to a 'gene card' (Fig. 2). The gene cards provide detailed information about the corresponding DNA and protein sequences. Each genome map in BacMap is searchable via BLAST and a gene name/synonym search.

Because of the growing interest in metagenomics and large-scale bacterial genome analysis, BacMap was extensively updated in 2012. With the latest update, all of BacMap’s bacterial genome maps now have separate prophage genome maps as well as separate tRNA and rRNA maps. Each bacterial chromosome entry in BacMap now contains graphs and tables on a variety of gene and protein statistics. All of the bacterial species listed in BacMap now have bacterial 'biography' cards, with corresponding information on the microbe’s taxonomy, phenotypic traits, other descriptions and electron microscopy or other high-resolution images of the microbe itself. BacMap also has a number of updated data browsing and text searching tools that allow filtering, sorting and more facile display of the chromosome maps and their contents.

== Scope and Access ==
All data in BacMap is non-proprietary or is derived from a non-proprietary source. It is freely accessible and available to anyone. In addition, nearly every data item is fully traceable and explicitly referenced to the original source. BacMap data is available through a public web interface and downloads.

== See also ==
- Nucleoid
- Circular bacterial chromosome
- Functional genomics
- BASys
- CGView
