= Owen White (bioinformatician) =

American bioinformatician

- Education: University of Massachusetts Amherst; New Mexico State University
- Employer: University of Maryland School of Medicine
- Known for: GLIMMER; MUMmer
- Awards: Benjamin Franklin Award (Bioinformatics) (2015)
- Scientific career
- Fields: Bioinformatics; Computational biology
- Workplaces: University of Maryland, Baltimore
- Thesis: (1992)
- Doctoral advisors: Christopher A. Fields
- Website: www.medschool.umaryland.edu/profiles/White-Owen/

Owen R. White is a bioinformatician and director of the Institute For Genome Sciences at the University of Maryland School of Medicine, United States. He is known for his work on the bioinformatics tools GLIMMER and MUMmer.

== Education ==
White studied biotechnology at the University of Massachusetts Amherst, earning a bachelor of science degree in 1985. He later studied with Christopher A. Fields at New Mexico State University, earning his PhD in molecular biology in 1992.

== Research ==
From 1992 to 1994, White was a postdoctoral fellow in the Genome Informatics department at The Institute for Genomic Research (TIGR) in Rockville, Maryland. This was followed by a period as a collaborative investigator in the Department of Bioinformatics at TIGR. While at TIGR, White was one of the developers of the GLIMMER (Gene Locator and Interpolated Markov ModelER) gene discovery algorithm, alongside Steven Salzberg and colleagues. Salzberg and White were also involved in the development of the MUMmer software for sequence alignment.

White became Director of bioinformatics at TIGR in 2000. He has also been involved in the National Institutes of Health Human Microbiome Project, where he was principal investigator of the Data Analysis and Coordination Center for the first phase of the project.

White is the primary investigator of the Neuroscience Multi-Omic Archive (NeMO Archive), the primary repository of genomic data from the BRAIN Initiative. In 2025, he confirmed that the NeMO Archive was addressing NIH requests "to improve our security measure to protect human data" and anticipated the ongoing review to continue "for some time". Meanwhile, NeMO Archive, along with at least 33 other online archives, placed a disclaimer that they are "under review for potential modification in compliance with Administration directives" as a result of Executive Order 14168. Former NIMH director Joshua A. Gordon suggested among the requests could be an "incredibly disturbing" attempt to remove gender identity data from mental health research databases like the NeMO Archive and the NIMH Data Archive. It is unclear whether White will comply with such requests.

== Awards and honors ==
In 2015, White was awarded the Benjamin Franklin Award in Bioinformatics for his promotion of free and open-access materials and methods in the life sciences.
