= QIIME =

Microbiome multi-omics bioinformatics tool

QIIME (English: /tʃaɪm/ ch-eye-m) is a bioinformatics data science platform, originally developed for analysis of high-throughput microbiome marker gene (e.g., 16S or 18S rRNA genes) amplicon sequencing data. There have been two major versions of the QIIME platform, QIIME 1 and QIIME 2.

While microbiome marker gene analysis continues to be a major focus in QIIME 2, the developers describe it as a microbiome multi-omics platform, and support exists or is being added for analysis of shotgun metagenomics and metatranscriptomics data, as well as metabolomics mass spectrometry data.

Development of QIIME 1 was initiated in the Knight Lab at the University of Colorado at Boulder, and the first version of QIIME 1 was released on 26 January 2010. Beginning in August 2011, QIIME 1 development was led as a collaboration between the Caporaso Lab at Northern Arizona University and the Knight Lab.

In January 2018, QIIME 2 succeeded QIIME 1. QIIME 2 development is led by the Caporaso Lab, but the project remains a community effort, with developers dispersed around the world. QIIME 2 users and developers can get help with the platform and network using the QIIME 2 Forum.

"QIIME" was originally coined as an acronym for Quantitative Insights Into Microbial Ecology, but since the development of QIIME 2 this acronym has not been used (e.g., the acronym was not referenced in the publication on QIIME 2).

== See also ==
- QIIME 2 website
- Microbial ecology
- Microbiome
