= Isochore (genetics) =

Region of genomic DNA

In genetics, an isochore is a large region of genomic DNA (greater than 300 kilobases) with a high degree of uniformity in GC content; that is, guanine (G) and cytosine (C) bases. The distribution of bases within a genome is non-random: different regions of the genome have different amounts of G-C base pairs, such that regions can be classified and identified by the proportion of G-C base pairs they contain.

Bernardi and colleagues first noticed the compositional non-uniformity of vertebrate genomes using thermal melting and density gradient centrifugation. The DNA fragments extracted by the gradient centrifugation were later termed "isochores", which was subsequently defined as "very long (much greater than 200 KB) DNA segments" that "are fairly homogeneous in base composition and belong to a small number of major classes distinguished by differences in guanine-cytosine (GC) content". Subsequently, the isochores "grew" and were claimed to be ">300 kb in size." The theory proposed that the isochore composition of genomes varies markedly between "warm-blooded" (homeotherm) vertebrates and "cold-blooded" (poikilotherm) vertebrates and later became known as the isochore theory.

== The thermodynamic stability hypothesis ==
The isochore theory purported that the genome of "warm-blooded" vertebrates (mammals and birds) are mosaics of long isochoric regions of alternating GC-poor and GC-rich composition, as opposed to the genome of "cold-blooded" vertebrates (fishes and amphibians) that were supposed to lack GC-rich isochores. These findings were explained by the thermodynamic stability hypothesis, attributing genomic structure to body temperature. GC-rich isochores were purported to be a form of adaptation to environmental pressures, as an increase in genomic GC-content could protect DNA, RNA, and proteins from degradation by heat. Despite its attractive simplicity, the thermodynamic stability hypothesis has been repeatedly shown to be in error . Many authors showed the absence of a relationship between temperature and GC-content in vertebrates, while others showed the existence of GC-rich domains in "cold-blooded" vertebrates such as crocodiles, amphibians, and fish.

== Principles of the isochore theory ==
The isochore theory was the first to identify the nonuniformity of nucleotide composition within vertebrate genomes and predict that the genome of "warm-blooded" vertebrates such as mammals and birds are mosaic of isochores (Bernardi et al. 1985). The human genome, for example, was described as a mosaic of alternating low and high GC content isochores belonging to five compositional families, L1, L2, H1, H2, and H3, whose corresponding ranges of GC contents were said to be <38%, 38%-42%, 42%-47%, 47%-52%, and >52%, respectively.

The main predictions of the isochore theory are that:

- GC content of the third codon position (GC3) of protein coding genes is correlated with the GC content of the isochores embedding the corresponding genes.
- The genome organization of warm-blooded vertebrates is a mosaic of mostly GC-rich isochores.
- Genome organization of cold-blooded vertebrates is characterized by low GC content levels and lower compositional heterogeneity than warm-blooded vertebrates. Homogeneous domains do not reach the high GC levels attained by the genomes of warm-blooded vertebrates.

== The neutralist-selectionist controversy ==
Two opposite explanations that endeavored to explain the formations of isochores were vigorously debated as part of the neutralist-selectionist controversy. The first view was that isochores reflect variable mutation processes among genomic regions consistent with the neutral model. Alternatively, isochores were posited as a result of natural selection for certain compositional environment required by certain genes. Several hypotheses derive from the selectionist view, such as the thermodynamic stability hypothesis and the biased gene conversion hypothesis. Thus far, none of the theories provides a comprehensive explanation to the genome structure, and the topic is still under debate.

== The rise and fall of the isochore theory ==
The isochore theory became one of the most useful theories in molecular evolution for many years. It was the first and most comprehensive attempt to explain the long-range compositional heterogeneity of vertebrate genomes within an evolutionary framework. Despite the interest in the early years in the isochore model, in recent years, the theory's methodology, terminology, and predictions have been challenged.

Because this theory was proposed in the 20th century before complete genomes were sequenced, it could not be fully tested for nearly 30 years. In the beginning of the 21st century, when the first genomes were made available it was clear that isochores do not exist in the human genome nor in other mammalian genomes. When failed to find isochores, many attacked the very existence of isochores. The most important predictor of isochores, GC3 was shown to have no predictable power to the GC content of nearby genomic regions, refuting findings from over 30 years of research, which were the basis for many isochore studies. Isochore-originators replied that the term was misinterpreted as isochores are not "homogeneous" but rather fairly homogeneous regions with a heterogeneous nature (especially) of GC-rich regions at the 5 kb scale, which only added to the already growing confusion. The reason for this ongoing frustration was the ambiguous definition of isochores as long and homogeneous, allowed some researchers to discover "isochores" and others to dismiss them, although both camps used the same data.

The unfortunate side effect of this controversy was an "arms race" in which isochores are frequently redefined and relabeled following conflicting findings that failed to reveal "mosaic of isochores." The unfortunate outcomes of this controversy and the following terminological-methodological mud were the loss of interest in isochores by the scientific community. When the most important core-concept in isochoric literature, the thermodynamic stability hypothesis, was rejected, the theory lost its appeal. Even today, there is no clear definition to isochores nor is there an algorithm that detects isochores. Isochores are detected manually by visual inspection of GC content curves , however because this approach lacks scientific merit and is difficult to replicate by independent groups, the findings remain disputed.

== The compositional domain model ==
As the study of isochores was de facto abandoned by most scientists, an alternative theory was proposed to describe the compositional organization of genomes in accordance with the most recent genomic studies. The Compositional Domain Model depicts genomes as a medley of short and long homogeneous and nonhomogeneous domains. The theory defines "compositional domains" as genomic regions with distinct GC-contents as determined by a computational segmentation algorithm. The homogeneity of compositional domains is compared to that of the chromosome on which they reside using the F-test, which separated them into compositionally homogeneous domains and compositionally nonhomogeneous domains based on the outcome of test. Compositionally homogeneous domains that are sufficiently long (≥ 300 kb) are termed isochores or isochoric domains. These terms are in accordance with the literature as they provide clear distinction between isochoric- and nonisochoric-domains.

A comprehensive study of the human genome unraveled a genomic organization where two-thirds of the genome is a mixture of many short compositionally homogeneous domains and relatively few long ones. The remaining portion of the genome is composed of nonhomogeneous domains. In terms of coverage, only 1% of the total number of compositionally homogeneous domains could be considered "isochores" which covered less than 20% of the genome.

Since its inception the theory received wide attention and was extensively used to explain findings emerging from over dozen new genome sequencing studies. However, many important questions remain open, such as which evolutionary forces shaped the structure of compositional domains and the ways they differ between different species.
