= List of Intelligent Systems for Molecular Biology keynote speakers =

The following is a list of Intelligent Systems for Molecular Biology (ISMB) keynote speakers.

ISMB is an academic conference on the subjects of bioinformatics and computational biology organised by the International Society for Computational Biology (ISCB). The conference has been held annually since 1993 and keynote talks have been presented since 1994. Keynotes are chosen to reflect outstanding research in bioinformatics. The recipients of the ISCB Overton Prize and ISCB Accomplishment by a Senior Scientist Award are invited to give keynote talks as part of the programme.

Keynote speakers include eight Nobel laureates: Richard J. Roberts (1994, 2006), John Sulston (1995), Manfred Eigen (1999), Gerald Edelman (2000), Sydney Brenner (2003), Kurt Wüthrich (2006), Robert Huber (2006) and Michael Levitt (2015).

== List of speakers ==
Conference	Keynote speakers	Title	Notes
ISMB 1994	Bruce Buchanan		
ISMB 1994	Lawrence Hunter		Plenary speaker
ISMB 1994	Richard J. Roberts		Plenary speaker
ISMB 1995	Douglas Brutlag		
ISMB 1995	John Sulston		
ISMB 1995	Janet Thornton		
ISMB 1996	Robert Waterston		
ISMB 1996	David Haussler		
ISMB 1996	Russell Doolittle		
ISMB 1996	Chris Sander		
ISMB 1997	Richard H. Lathrop		
ISMB 1997	Marcie McClure		
ISMB 1997	Hans Westerhoff		
ISMB 1998	Robert Cedergren		
ISMB 1998	Michael Waterman		
ISMB 1998	Shoshana Wodak		
ISMB 1999	Manfred Eigen	The Origin of Biological Information	
ISMB 1999	Amos Bairoch	Swiss-Prot in the 21st century!	
ISMB 1999	Richard M. Karp	Combinatorial Problems in Gene expression Analysis Using DNA microarrays	
ISMB 1999	Anthony R. Kerlavage	Computational genomics: Biological Discovery in Complete Genomes	
ISMB 1999	Eugene Koonin	Comparative genomics: Is it changing the paradigm of evolutionary biology?	
ISMB 1999	David Balaban	Genes, Chips, and Genomes	
ISMB 1999	Matthias Mann	Gene Function via the Mass Spectrometric Analysis of Multi-Protein Complexes	
ISMB 1999	Michael Sternberg	Exploiting Protein Structure in the Post-genome Era	
ISMB 2000	Gerald Edelman		
ISMB 2000	Leroy Hood		
ISMB 2000	Minoru Kanehisa		
ISMB 2000	J. Andrew McCammon		
ISMB 2000	Eugene Myers		
ISMB 2000	Harold Scheraga		
ISMB 2000	David Searls		
ISMB 2001	Christopher Burge		
ISMB 2001	Chris Dobson		
ISMB 2001	Sean Eddy		
ISMB 2001	David Eisenberg		
ISMB 2001	Bernardo Huberman		
ISMB 2001	Chris Sander		
ISMB 2001	Gunnar von Heijne		
ISMB 2002	Stephen Altschul	Assessing the accuracy of database search methods, and improving the performance of PSI-BLAST	
ISMB 2002	Michael Ashburner		
ISMB 2002	Ford Doolittle		
ISMB 2002	Terry Gaasterland		
ISMB 2002	Barry Honig		
ISMB 2002	David Baker		2002 ISCB Overton Prize winner
ISMB 2002	John Reinitz		
ISMB 2002	Isidore Rigoutsos		
ISMB 2003	Sydney Brenner	The Evolution of Genes and Genomes	
ISMB 2003	David Haussler	Identifying functional elements in the human genome by tracing the evolutionary history of the bases: a key challenge for comparative genomics	
ISMB 2003	Yoshihide Hayashizaki	Dynamic Eukaryotic Transcriptome	
ISMB 2003	Jim Kent	Patching and Painting the Human Genome	2003 ISCB Overton Prize winner
ISMB 2003	John Mattick	Programming of the autopoietic development of complex organisms: the hidden layer of noncoding RNA	
ISMB 2003	David Sankoff	The Parameters of Genome Rearrangement	2003 ISCB Senior Scientist Award winner
ISMB 2003	Ron Shamir	Reconstructing Genetic Networks	
ISMB 2003	Michael Waterman	Dynamic Programming Algorithms for Haplotype Block Partitioning	
ISMB/ECCB 2004	Leroy Hood	Systems Biology: Strategies for Deciphering Life	
ISMB/ECCB 2004	Denis Noble	Computational systems biology of the heart	
ISMB/ECCB 2004	Eric D. Green	Decoding the Human Genome by Multi-Species Sequence Comparisons	
ISMB/ECCB 2004	Svante Pääbo	Evolution of the primate transcriptome	
ISMB/ECCB 2004	Matthias Mann	Organellar and time resolved proteomics	
ISMB/ECCB 2004	Anna Tramontano	Progress, assessment and perspectives in protein structure prediction	
ISMB/ECCB 2004	Uri Alon	Simplicity in complex biological networks	2004 ISCB Overton Prize winner
ISMB/ECCB 2004	David J. Lipman	Message and meaning in sequence comparison: is systems biology possible?	2004 ISCB Senior Scientist Award winner
ISMB 2005	Howard Cash	Biology of Life and Death: Disaster, DNA and the Information Science of Human Identification	
ISMB 2005	Gunnar von Heijne	Membrane Proteins in vivo and in silico - Getting the Best of Two Worlds	
ISMB 2005	Jill Mesirov	Gene Expression Analysis: A Knowledge-based Approach	
ISMB 2005	Pavel A. Pevzner	Transforming Men into Mice: Fragile versus Random Breakage Models of Chromosome Evolution	
ISMB 2005	Peter Hunter	Computational Physiology and the IUPS Physiome Project	
ISMB 2005	Satoru Miyano	Computational Challenges for Gene Networks	
ISMB 2005	Ewan Birney	Genomes to Systems Biology	2005 ISCB Overton Prize winner
ISMB 2005	Janet Thornton	From Proteins to Life - Old and New Challenges	2005 ISCB Senior Scientist Award winner
ISMB 2006	Robert Huber	Molecular machines for protein degradation	
ISMB 2006	Tom Blundell	Structural biology, informatics and the discovery of new medicines	
ISMB 2006	Kurt Wüthrich	Computational Aspects of NMR Studies with Proteins in Solution	
ISMB 2006	Mathieu Blanchette	What mammalian genomes tell us about our ancestors, and vice versa	2006 ISCB Overton Prize winner
ISMB 2006	Elena Conti	Molecular mechanisms in RNA degradation	
ISMB 2006	Charles DeLisi	New Approaches to Biomarker Discovery	
ISMB 2006	Richard J. Roberts	The need of Bioinformatics for experimental biologists	
ISMB 2006	Michael Waterman	Whole Genome Optical Mapping	2006 ISCB Senior Scientist Award winner
ISMB/ECCB 2007	Eran Segal	Quantitative Models for Chromatin and Transcription Regulation	2007 ISCB Overton Prize winner
ISMB/ECCB 2007	Temple F. Smith	Computational Biology: What is next?	2007 ISCB Senior Scientist Award winner
ISMB/ECCB 2007	Søren Brunak	Understanding interactomes by data integration	
ISMB/ECCB 2007	Stephen K. Burley	Fragment-based discovery of BCR-ABL inhibitors for treatment of chronic myelogenous leukemia	
ISMB/ECCB 2007	Michael Eisen	Understanding and exploiting the evolution of the sequences that control gene expression	
ISMB/ECCB 2007	Anne-Claude Gavin	Interaction Networks Probed by Mass Spectrometry	
ISMB/ECCB 2007	John Mattick	The majority of the genome of complex organisms is devoted to an RNA regulatory system that directs differentiation and development	
ISMB/ECCB 2007	Erin K. O'Shea	Dissecting Transcriptional Network Structure and Function	
ISMB/ECCB 2007	Renée Schroeder	Genomic SELEX for the identification of novel non-coding RNAs independent of their expression level	
ISMB/ECCB 2007	Terry Speed	Genome-wide genotyping: the great classification challenge	
ISMB 2008	Aviv Regev	Modular biology: the function and evolution of molecular networks	2008 ISCB Overton Prize winner
ISMB 2008	David Haussler	100 Million Years of Evolutionary History of the Human Genome	2008 ISCB Senior Scientist Award winner
ISMB 2008	Claire M. Fraser-Liggett	Microbial Communities in Health and Disease	
ISMB 2008	David Jaffe	Tiny bits and pieces: new sequencing technologies and what they can do for you	
ISMB 2008	Eugene Myers	Imaging Bioinformatics	
ISMB 2008	Morag Park	Profiling the Breast Tumor Microenvironment	
ISMB 2008	Bernhard Palsson	Systems Biology: an era of reconstruction and interrogation	
ISMB 2008	Hanah Margalit	Intriguing roles for small non-coding RNAs in the cellular regulatory networks	
ISMB/ECCB 2009	Trey Ideker	New Challenges and Opportunities in Network Biology	2009 ISCB Overton Prize winner
ISMB/ECCB 2009	Webb Miller	Bioinformatics Methods to Study Species Extinctions	2009 ISCB Senior Scientist Award winner
ISMB/ECCB 2009	Pierre-Henri Gouyon	Information and Biology	
ISMB/ECCB 2009	Daphne Koller	Individual Genetic Variation: From Networks to Mechanisms	
ISMB/ECCB 2009	Thomas Lengauer	Chasing the AIDS Virus	
ISMB/ECCB 2009	Eugenia María del Pino Veintimilla	The comparative analysis reveals independence of developmental processes during early development in frogs	
ISMB/ECCB 2009	Tomaso Poggio	Computational Neuroscience: Models of the Visual System	
ISMB/ECCB 2009	Mathias Uhlén	A global view on protein expression based on the Human Protein Atlas	
ISMB 2010	Steven E. Brenner	Ultraconserved nonsense: gene regulation by splicing & RNA surveillance	2010 ISCB Overton Prize winner
ISMB 2010	Susan Lindquist	Protein Folding and Environmental Stress REDRAW the Relationship between Genotype and Phenotype	
ISMB 2010	Svante Pääbo	Analyses of Pleistocene Genomes	
ISMB 2010	Chris Sander	Systems Biology of Cancer Cells	2010 ISCB Senior Scientist Award winner
ISMB 2010	David Altshuler	Genomic Variation and the Inherited Basis of Common Disease	
ISMB 2010	George M. Church	BI/O: Reading and Writing Genomes	
ISMB 2010	Robert Weinberg	Cancer Stem Cells and the Evolution of Malignancy	Special Public Lecture
ISMB/ECCB 2011	Bonnie Berger	Computational biology in the 21st century: making sense out of massive data	
ISMB/ECCB 2011	Olga Troyanskaya	Integrating computation and experiments for a molecular-level understanding of human disease	2011 ISCB Overton Prize winner
ISMB/ECCB 2011	Janet Thornton	The Evolution of Enzyme Mechanisms and Functional Diversity	ECCB 10th Anniversary Keynote
ISMB/ECCB 2011	Alfonso Valencia	Challenges for Bioinformatics in Personalized Cancer Medicine	2011 ISCB Fellow
ISMB/ECCB 2011	Luis Serrano	M. pneumoniae (Towards a full quantitative understanding of a free-living system)	
ISMB/ECCB 2011	Michael Ashburner	From sequences to ontologies - adventures in informatics	2011 ISCB Senior Scientist Award winner
ISMB 2012	Richard H. Lathrop & Lawrence Hunter	Seeing forward by looking back	ISMB 20th Anniversary Keynote
ISMB 2012	Ziv Bar-Joseph	Data integration for understanding dynamic biological systems	2012 ISCB Overton Prize winner
ISMB 2012	Barbara Wold	Analysis of transcriptome structure and chromatin landscapes	
ISMB 2012	Richard M. Durbin	Progress, challenges and opportunities in population genome sequencing	2012 ISCB Fellow
ISMB 2012	Andrej Šali	Integrative Structural Biology	
ISMB 2012	Gunnar von Heijne	The other Third: Coming to grips with membrane proteins	2012 ISCB Senior Scientist Award winner
ISMB/ECCB 2013	Gil Ast	How Chromatin organization and epigenetics talk with alternative splicing	
ISMB/ECCB 2013	Gonçalo Abecasis	Insights from Sequencing Thousands of Human Genomes	2013 ISCB Overton Prize winner
ISMB/ECCB 2013	Lior Pachter	Sequencing based functional genomics (analysis)	
ISMB/ECCB 2013	Gary Stormo	Searching for Signals in Sequences	2013 ISCB Fellow
ISMB/ECCB 2013	Carole Goble	Results may vary: what is reproducible? why do open science and who gets the credit?	
ISMB/ECCB 2013	David Eisenberg	Protein Interactions in Health and Disease	2013 ISCB Senior Scientist Award winner
ISMB 2014	Isaac Kohane	Biomedical Quants of the World Unite! We only have our disease burden to lose	
ISMB 2014	Eugene Myers	DNA Assembly: Past, Present, and Future	2014 ISCB Senior Scientist Award winner
ISMB 2014	Michal Linial	Good Things Come in Small Packages – Replicators and Innovators	
ISMB 2014	Dana Pe'er	A multidimensional single cell approach to understand cellular behavior	2014 ISCB Overton Prize winner
ISMB 2014	Robert S. Langer	Biomaterials and biotechnology: From the discovery of the first angiogenesis inhibitors to the development of controlled drug delivery systems and the foundation of tissue engineering	
ISMB 2014	Russ Altman	Informatics for understanding drug response at all scales	2014 ISCB Fellow
ISMB 2015	Michael Levitt	Birth & Future of Multiscale Modeling of Macromolecules	
ISMB 2015	Curtis Huttenhower	Understanding microbial community function and the human microbiome in health and disease	2015 ISCB Overton Prize winner
ISMB 2015	Eileen Furlong	Genome regulation during embryonic development	
ISMB 2015	Kenneth H Wolfe	TBA	
ISMB 2015	Cyrus Chothia	TBA	2015 ISCB Senior Scientist Award winner
ISMB 2015	Amos Bairoch	TBA	2015 ISCB Fellow
ISMB 2016	Ruth Nussinov	Ras signaling: a challenge to the biological sciences	2016 ISCB Fellow
ISMB 2016	Debora Marks		2016 ISCB Overton Prize winner
ISMB 2016	Sandrine Dudoit	Identification of Novel Cell Types in the Brain Using Single-Cell Transcriptome Sequencing	
ISMB 2016	Sarah Teichmann	Understanding Cellular Heterogeneity	
ISMB 2016	Serafim Batzoglou		2016 ISCB Innovator Award winner
ISMB 2016	Søren Brunak		2016 ISCB Senior Scientist Award winner
