= Nikos Kyrpides =

Greek-American bioscientist (born 1963)

- Νίκος X. Κυρπίδης
- Born: November 11, 1963 (age 62); Serres, Greece
- Education: Aristotle University of Thessaloniki
- Known for: Microbial genomics, metagenomics, Microbiome, Virome, microbiome data science
- Scientific career
- Fields: Bioinformatics, microbiology, virology, computational biology, data science
- Workplaces: Joint Genome Institute, Lawrence Berkeley National Laboratory
- Academic advisors: Carl Woese, Ross Overbeek
- Website: https://jgi.doe.gov/our-science/scientists-jgi/nikos-kyrpides/

Nikos Kyrpides (Greek: Νίκος Κυρπίδης) is a Greek-American bioscientist who has worked on the origins of life, information processing, bioinformatics, microbiology, metagenomics and microbiome data science. He is a senior staff scientist at the Berkeley National Laboratory, head of the Prokaryote Super Program and leads the Microbiome Data Science program at the US Department of Energy Joint Genome Institute.

== Education ==
Kyrpides was born in Serres, Greece, where he studied biology at the Aristotle University of Thessaloniki and received his PhD in molecular biology and biotechnology from the University of Crete. He pursued postdoctoral studies in microbiology with Carl Woese at the University of Illinois at Urbana-Champaign and in bioinformatics with Ross Overbeek at the Argonne National Laboratory. From 1999 to 2004 Kyrpides worked in the biotech industry in Chicago, where he led the development of genome analysis and bioinformatics. He joined the United States Department of Energy Joint Genome Institute (JGI) in 2004 to lead the Genome Biology Program and develop the data management and comparative analysis platforms for microbial genomes and metagenomes. Kyrpides became the Metagenomics Program head in 2010 and founded the Prokaryotic Super Program in 2011, which he still leads with the Microbiome Data Science Group.

== Research ==
Kyrpides's early work focused on the origins and evolution of the genetic code. In collaboration with Christos Ouzounis, he developed a series of hypotheses for the transfer of information from proteins to nucleic acids known as reverse interpretation. With the advent of genomics, Kyrpides turned his interest to the study and understanding of the last universal common ancestor. With Ouzounis he coined the acronym "LUCA" at a conference organized by Patrick Forterre at Les Treilles, France, and performed some of the first comparative genome analysis to predict the gene content of the LUCA. Kyrpides's work on the information processing systems revealed several previously-unsuspected relationships, suggesting new models for the evolution of those processes. He identified previously-undetected relationships between the eukaryotic and bacterial translation machinery, suggesting that the rudiments of translation initiation would have been present at the universal-ancestor stage. Kyrpides's work on the evolution of transcription helped change the understanding of the nature and organization of archaeal transcription machinery, which (at the time) was that transcription in Archaea was strictly similar to that in eukaryotes. Kyrpides and Ouzounis demonstrated the parallel existence of a large number of bacterial-type transcription factors in archaeal genomes.

He led the development of several pioneering data-management systems in microbial genomics and metagenomics, which are widely used in the scientific community (with several thousand users worldwide). These include systems for data management and curation of genome projects and their associated metadata, such as the Genomes OnLine Database (GOLD), and comparative-genomics systems such as ERGO and the Integrated Microbial Genomes (IMG).

Kyrpides's current research focuses on microbiome research, with an emphasis on microbiome data science. This includes the understanding of structure and function of various microorganisms and microbial communities and the elucidation of the evolutionary dynamics shaping the microbial genomes. To accomplish that, his group is developing novel computational methods for enabling large-scale comparative analysis and mining and visualizing big data. He proposed and published the first study on the use of standard benchmarking data for the evaluation of method accuracy in metagenomics. This approach has become the standard in the field. Some of Kyrpides's recent research in microbiome data science include the exploration of Earth's virome, the identification of new bacterial phyla the prediction of novel folds using metagenomic sequences, and the discovery and characterization of new protein families from microbiome data.

== International initiatives ==
Kyrpides began the MikroBioKosmos (MBK) initiative in Greece in 2007, with the goal of exploring and commercially using microbial national resources. MikroBioKosmos became a scientific society, with Kyrpides its first president. He is a founding member of two bioinformatics societies in Greece: the Hellenic Society of Computational Biology and Bioinformatics (HSCBB) in 2010 and Hellenic Bioinformatics in 2016. Kyrpides is also a board member of the international Genomic Standards Consortium (GSC), which aims to enable genomic data integration, discovery and comparison with international, community-driven standards.

He began the Genomic Encyclopedia of Bacteria and Archaea (GEBA) project at the JGI and the Microbial Earth Project with Hans-Peter Klenk, Philip Hugenholtz and Jonathan Eisen in 2007, with the goal of improving the genome characterization of phylogenetically-diverse cultured microbes. The latter project evolved into an international effort to sequence all the type strains of bacteria and archaea, through a series of GEBA 1,000-genome projects. The rapid growth of microbial genome sequences at the end of 2010, without a parallel venue for describing those projects in a standardized manner, led to the need for a new scientific forum which would be a clearinghouse for capturing and presenting this information to the community. This idea led Kyrpides, George Garrity and Dawn Field to launch a new scientific journal: Standards in Genomic Sciences (SIGS), which became part of BioMed Central.

Kyrpides proposed the development of a Microbial Environmental Genomics Administration in 2009, analogous to NASA, for the study and exploration of the most abundant life on the planet. In 2016, following the enormous growth of microbiome data, he outlined the need for a common infrastructure for microbiome data analysis and proposed the development of a National Microbiome Data Center (NMDC), later renamed to National Microbiome Data Collaborative. With Emiley Eloe-Fadrosh, Kyrpides organized the first NMDC workshop to launch this initiative at the Joint Genome Institute. This was followed by additional workshops in 2017 hosted by the American Society for Microbiology to promote the initiative.

== Awards and honours ==
Kyrpides has received several awards, including the 2022 Exceptional Scientific Achievement Award from the Director of Lawrence Berkeley National Laboratory, the 2018 USFCC/J. Roger Porter Award from the American Society for Microbiology, the 2014 van Niel International Prize for Studies in Bacterial Systematics from the International Union of Microbiological Societies (IUMS), a 2007 outstanding-performance award from the Lawrence Berkeley National Laboratory, and the 2012 Academic Excellence Prize from the Empirikion Foundation. He is an elected fellow of the American Academy of Microbiology (AAM) (2014), and has been on the Thomson Reuters list of the world's most frequently-cited scientists since 2014. A bacterial genus (Kyrpidia) was named after Kyrpides in 2011. In 2017, he received an honorary doctorate from the Aristotle University of Thessaloniki.
