= Gonçalo Abecasis =

Portuguese researcher

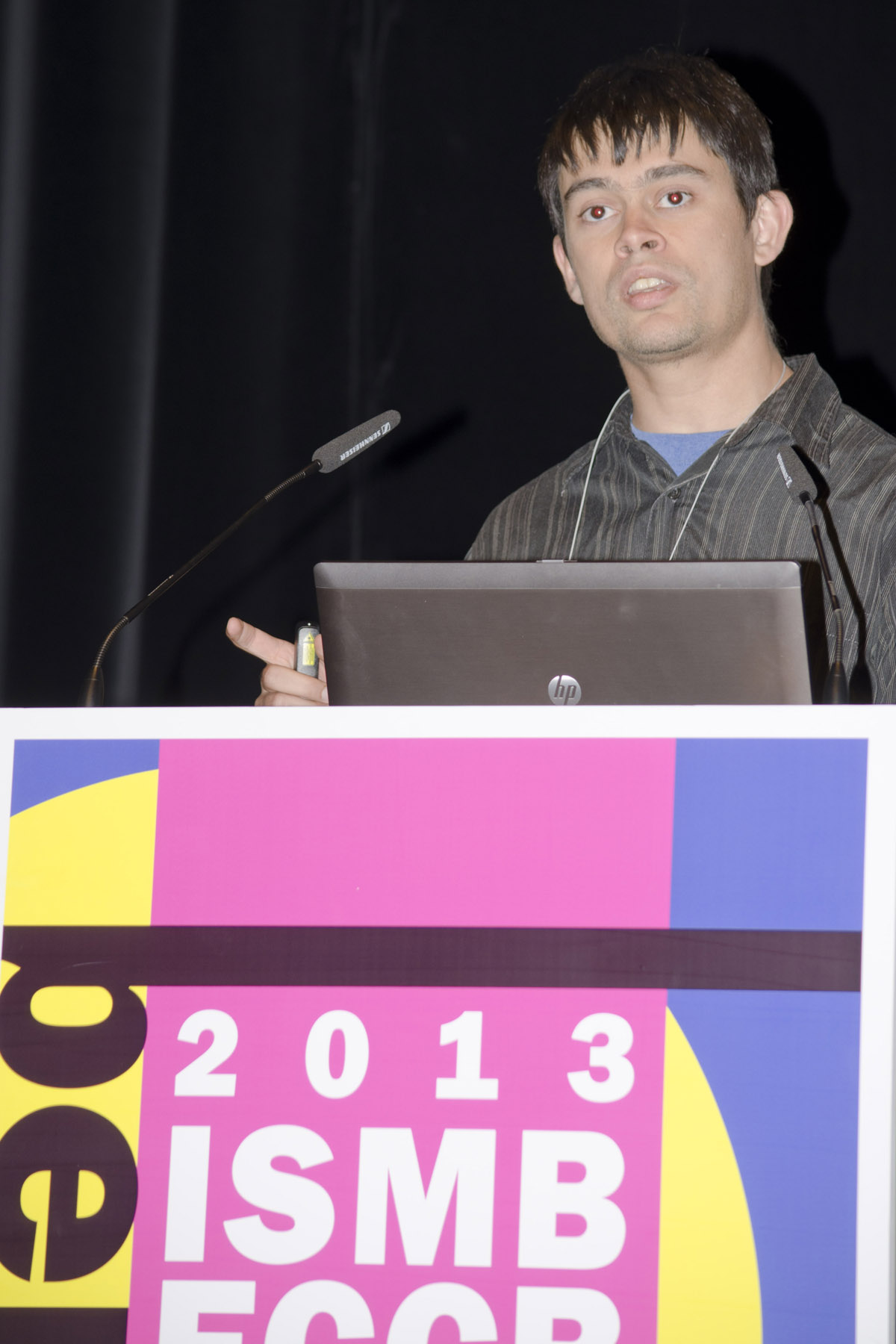
- Abecasis giving a keynote speech at ISMB
- Born: Gonçalo Rocha Abecasis; May 8, 1976 (age 50)
- Education: University of Leeds; University of Oxford
- Spouse: Cristen Willer
- Children: 5
- Awards: Overton Prize (2013)
- Scientific career
- Fields: Bioinformatics; Computational biology Biostatistics
- Workplaces: University of Michigan
- Thesis: Methods for fine mapping complex traits in human pedigrees (2001)
- Doctoral advisor: William Cookson
- Doctoral students: Mingyao Li
- Website: www.sph.umich.edu/csg/abecasis/

Notes
- Works at Regeneron

Gonçalo Rocha Abecasis (born 1976) is a Portuguese American biomedical researcher at the University of Michigan, serves as Vice President & Chief Genomics and Data Science Officer at the Regeneron Genetics Center, and was chair of the Department of Biostatistics in the School of Public Health. He leads a group at the Center for Statistical Genetics in the Department of Biostatistics, where he is also the Felix E. Moore Collegiate Professor of Biostatistics and director of the Michigan Genomic Initiative. His group develops statistical tools to analyze the genetics of human disease.

== Education and early life ==
Abecasis is the oldest of 12 children in his family, born in Moura to José Manuel and Maria Teresa. He grew up in Portugal and Macau (then Portuguese Macau). After learning computer programming in a high school club, he received a Bachelor of Science degree in Genetics from the University of Leeds in 1997, working with Marie-Anne Shaw, and a D. Phil in human genetics from the University of Oxford in 2001, working with William Cookson and Lon Cardon.

== Research ==
Abecasis works on statistical and computational approaches to human genetic disease, including psoriasis and cardiovascular diseases. His group develops tools to analyze and visualize biomedical data, often using C++. He first applied his programming knowledge during his Ph.D. studies to develop tools to analyze the data on asthma susceptibility that his project was generating. He continued as a biostatistician when he moved to Michigan in 2001, where he was recruited and mentored by Michael Boehnke. He is a proponent of data sharing. His work has included the 1000 Genomes Project and a collaboration with Oxford researchers.

== Awards and honours ==
Abecasis won an Excellence in Research Award from the University of Michigan School of Public Health in 2008, and he became a professor at the University of Michigan in 2009. He won the 2013 Overton Prize from the International Society for Computational Biology, giving a keynote speech at the ISMB, and was named a Pew Scholar by the Pew Charitable Trusts in 2005. His work was cited in 2010 by US Vice-President Joe Biden in a speech on the importance of biomedical research regarding the Recovery Act Innovation Report.

His published work is influential - as of 2018, he had an h-index of 145 and 144,018 citations. Thomson Reuters noted that he had 10 'hot papers' (in the top 0.1% by citations) in 2009. He was also noted for his 'hot papers' in 2011 and 2012.

In October 2014, he was awarded the Curt Stern Award in Human Genetics by the American Society of Human Genetics (jointly with Mark J. Daly).

He was elected to the Institute of Medicine in October 2014.

== Personal life ==
Goncalo is married to University of Michigan scientist Cristen Willer. They have five children.
