= Sonja Berndt =

American pharmacologist and cancer epidemiologist

- Education: Dartmouth College; University of Michigan College of Pharmacy; Johns Hopkins Bloomberg School of Public Health
- Scientific career
- Fields: Cancer epidemiology
- Workplaces: National Cancer Institute
- Doctoral advisor: Kathy J. Helzlsouer

Sonja Ingrid Berndt is an American pharmacologist and cancer epidemiologist who researches non-Hodgkin lymphoma, prostate cancer, and anthropometric traits that are cancer risk factors. She is a senior investigator in the occupational and environmental epidemiology branch at the National Cancer Institute.

== Life ==
Berndt was born to Helen and Bruce Berndt. She was raised with two sisters. She earned a B.A. in English with honors from Dartmouth College in 1994. Berndt completed pre-pharmacy curriculum at the University of Illinois Urbana-Champaign in 1995. She received a Pharm.D. summa cum laude from the University of Michigan College of Pharmacy in 1999. From 1999 to 2000, she was a pharmacy practice resident and clinical instructor at the University of Michigan Medical Center. In 2000, Berndt enrolled in the Ph.D. program in epidemiology at the Johns Hopkins Bloomberg School of Public Health. She joined the National Cancer Institute (NCI) division of cancer epidemiology and genetics (DCEG) in 2003 as a pre-doctoral fellow. Berndt completed her Ph.D. in epidemiology in 2006. Her dissertation was titled, Genetic polymorphisms in DNA repair genes and the risk of colorectal neoplasia. Kathy J. Helzlsouer was her doctoral advisor and Richard B. Hayes was her mentor at NCI. She became a post-doctoral fellow in 2006 within the NCI occupational and environmental epidemiology branch.

In 2009, Berndt was appointed to the position of tenure-track investigator at the NCI. She was awarded scientific tenure and promoted to senior investigator in March 2017. Berndt’s research focuses on the genetic and molecular etiology of non-Hodgkin lymphoma (NHL) and prostate cancer, as well as anthropometric traits that are known risk factors for cancer. She uses statistics to investigate underlying risk factors for cancer.

== Selected publications ==
- Speliotes, Elizabeth; Willer, Cristen; Berndt, Sonja Ingrid; et al. (2010). "Association analyses of 249,796 individuals reveal 18 new loci associated with body mass index". Nature Genetics. 42 (11): 937–48. doi:10.1038/ng.686. PMC 3014648. PMID 20935630. Wikidata Q29547208.
- Locke, Adam; Kahali, Bratati; Berndt, Sonja Ingrid; et al. (2015). "Genetic studies of body mass index yield new insights for obesity biology". Nature. 518 (7538): 197–206. doi:10.1038/nature14177. PMC 4382211. PMID 25673413. Wikidata Q22305005.
- Allen, Hana; Estrada, Karol; Lettre, Guillaume; et al. (2010). "Hundreds of variants clustered in genomic loci and biological pathways affect human height". Nature. 467 (7317): 832–8. doi:10.1038/nature09410. PMC 2955183. PMID 20881960. Wikidata Q24630979.
