= Foxman =

Foxman is an English surname. Notable people with the surname include:

- Abraham Foxman (1940–2026), American lawyer and activist
- Betsy Foxman (born 1955), American epidemiologist

== See also ==
- Fox spirit, a mythical fox entity that is a common motif in East Asian mythology
