= Nussinov plots =

Methodology to reveal RNA structure by Ruth Nussinov

RNA and tRNA generally has a complex two-dimensional structure. Ruth Nussinov realized that there was a simple way to reveal the structure of RNA and tRNA. The methodology is to create a circle. Each base is numbered. If there are "n" bases, then the numbers are 1 through n. Each number is represented as a dot on the circle, progressively from 1 through n. For bases that are bonded together (for example, 2 and 48, a line is drawn between 2 and 48. The resulting Nussinov plot will easily reveal secondary structures such as cloverleaf structures in RNA or tRNA (the presence of "flowers"). If chords drawn intersect, this corresponds to pseudoknots in the tRNA structure. Pseudoknots imply twists in the RNA or tRNA structure (the RNA or tRNA is not really planar). Lines (bonds between flowers, for example) explain 3-dimensional folding (tertiary folding). Unfortunately, this is difficult to visualize, thus it is best to see an explanation with diagrams.

The spatial geometry of RNA can explain diseases of medical genetics: specifically, when folding and twisting becomes a difficulty for ribosomal processing.
