= Kathy J. Helzlsouer =

American oncologist and cancer epidemiologist

- Education: University of Pittsburgh School of Medicine; Johns Hopkins Bloomberg School of Public Health
- Scientific career
- Fields: Cancer etiology and prevention, epidemiology, women's health, genetic counseling
- Workplaces: Johns Hopkins University; National Cancer Institute
- Doctoral students: Sonja Berndt

Kathy J. Helzlsouer is an American oncologist, internist, and cancer epidemiologist who investigates cancer etiology and prevention, women's health, genetic counseling, and translational research. At the National Cancer Institute, she is the associate director of the epidemiology and genomics research program and chief medical officer for the division of cancer control and population sciences.

== Life ==
Helzlsouer received her medical degree from the University of Pittsburgh School of Medicine and obtained a Master of Health Science in Epidemiology from the Johns Hopkins Bloomberg School of Public Health. She is board certified in internal medicine and medical oncology. She completed her internal medicine residency at the University of Virginia and medical oncology fellowship at Johns Hopkins University. She is specialized in cancer epidemiology, cancer genetic counseling, and clinical research.

Helzlsouer was a professor in the department of epidemiology at the Johns Hopkins University Bloomberg School of Public Health. Her clinical activities focused on cancer risk assessment and cancer survivorship. In October 2015, she later joined the National Cancer Institute (NCI). She served as the NCI associate director of the epidemiology and genomics research program (EGRP) and chief medical officer for the division of cancer control and population sciences (DCCPS) from 2015 until 2023. Helzlsouer has published in the fields of cancer epidemiology, cancer etiology and prevention, women's health, and clinical and translational research.
