= Mingyao Li =

Chinese-American biostatistician

Mingyao Li is a Chinese-American biostatistician and statistical geneticist known for her research on genetic factors related to heart disease, and as one of the creators of the ANNOVAR bioinformatics software tool. She is a professor of biostatistics in the Perelman School of Medicine at the University of Pennsylvania.

== Education and career ==
Li studied mathematics at Nankai University, earning a bachelor's degree in 1996 and master's degree in 1999. She earned a second master's degree in 2002 and completed a Ph.D. in biostatistics in 2005 at the University of Michigan, with the dissertation Statistical methods in gene mapping of complex diseases jointly advised by Michael Boehnke and Gonçalo Abecasis.

After postdoctoral research at the University of Michigan, she joined the University of Pennsylvania faculty as an assistant professor of biostatistics in 2006, was tenured as an associate professor in 2012, and was promoted to full professor in 2017. In 2014 she added a secondary appointment in the university's Department of Computer and Information Science.

== Recognition ==
Li became an Elected Member of the International Statistical Institute in 2014 and a Fellow of the American Statistical Association in 2018. She was named to the 2021 class of Fellows of the American Association for the Advancement of Science.
