= Drosophilist =

Scientist studying the species Drosophila melanogaster

Drosophilist is a term used to refer to both the specific group of scientists trained in the laboratory of Thomas Hunt Morgan, and more generally any scientist who uses the fruit fly Drosophila melanogaster to study genetics, development, neurogenetics, behavior and a host of other subjects in animal biology.

The core members of the original drosophilists at Columbia University included Morgan, Alfred Sturtevant, Calvin Bridges and Hermann Joseph Muller. Drosophilists directly connected with Morgan at Caltech included Theodosius Dobzhansky and George Beadle.

According to Thomas Hunt Morgan’s biography, Charles William Woodworth, an American entomologist, was the first scientist to breed Drosophila melanogaster insect in captivity at Harvard University, and he suggested to William Ernest Castle to use it in genetics studies, in parallel to mice, after Castle’s personal rediscovery of Gregor Mendel’s work in 1900. The studies of Castle and his group on inbreeding interested the entomologist Frank Eugene Lutz, who worked on the genetics of this insect at the Carnegie Institution’s new Station for Experimental Evolution at Cold Spring Harbor, Long Island, New York, from 1904 to 1909. Lutz introduced the fruit fly to T. H. Morgan, who was seeking less expensive organisms—compared to Castle’s mice lines—that could be bred in the very limited space of his laboratory. Starting in 1909, Morgan was soon able to identify and isolate many visible mutants and to determine the localization and behavior of genes; in January 1910, he discovered his first Drosophila mutant, a white-eyed male that he showed to be affected by a mutation on the X chromosome. Later, together with his group and especially with the help of his student Alfred Henry Sturtevant, he was also able to map and align other genes to chromosomes, creating one of the first genome-wide genetic maps.

== Drosophilists who have won Nobel Prizes ==
Nine drosophilists have won Nobel Prizes for their work in Drosophila:

- Thomas Hunt Morgan – for his discovery that chromosomes contain linear arrangements of genes
- Hermann Joseph Muller – for his discovery that X-rays can produce mutations
- Christiane Nüsslein-Volhard – Shared with Wieschaus and Lewis "for their discoveries concerning the genetic control of early embryonic development"
- Eric Wieschaus
- Edward B. Lewis
- Jules A. Hoffmann – "for discoveries concerning the activation of innate immunity"
- Michael Rosbash - Shared with Young and Hall "for their discoveries of molecular mechanisms controlling the circadian rhythm"
- Michael W. Young
- Jeffrey C. Hall

A few other drosophilists won Nobel Prizes for work done in other systems:

- George Wells Beadle – for work done with Neurospora crassa
- Edward Lawrie Tatum – for work done with N. crassa
- Richard Axel – for work on the mouse olfactory system

== Other notable drosophilists ==
- Walter Jakob Gehring
- Michael Levine
- William McGinnis
- Seymour Benzer
- Gero Miesenböck
- Gerald M. Rubin
- Allan C. Spradling
- Andrea Brand
- Norbert Perrimon
- Huda Zoghbi
- John Carlson
- Leslie B. Vosshall
- David Suzuki – a former drosophilist who became a notable science communicator
- Lily Jan and Yuh Nung Jan
- Michael Ashburner
- Jean-Paul Vincent
