= Reinhard Schneider (biologist) =

German computational biologist

- Schneider in [2010]
- Born: 3 December 1960
- Died: August 2026
- Education: Heidelberg University
- Known for: HSSP, Reflect
- Awards: ISCB Outstanding Contributions Award (2022); Elsevier Grand Challenge, first prize (2009)
- Scientific career
- Fields: Bioinformatics, computational biology
- Workplaces: University of Luxembourg; European Molecular Biology Laboratory; LION Bioscience
- Thesis: Sequenz und Sequenz-Struktur Vergleiche und deren Anwendung für die Struktur- und Funktionsvorhersage von Proteinen (1994)
- Doctoral advisor: Chris Sander

Reinhard Schneider (3 December 1960 – 20 August 2026) was a German computational biologist. He was Professor of Bioinformatics at the University of Luxembourg and head of the Bioinformatics Core at its Luxembourg Centre for Systems Biomedicine (LCSB). His work focused on protein structure and sequence analysis, data integration, and software infrastructure for the life sciences, and he co-founded the bioinformatics company LION Bioscience. His publications had been cited more than 21,000 times as of November 2026.

== Education ==
Schneider carried out his diploma work (1988–1989) and his doctoral research (1990–1994) at the European Molecular Biology Laboratory (EMBL) in Heidelberg, in the group of Chris Sander. He received his PhD in biology from Heidelberg University with a 1994 thesis titled Sequenz und Sequenz-Struktur Vergleiche und deren Anwendung für die Struktur- und Funktionsvorhersage von Proteinen ("Sequence and sequence–structure comparisons and their application to the prediction of protein structure and function"). The thesis summary names K. C. Holmes of the Max Planck Institute for Medical Research as supervisor. Burkhard Rost carried out his doctoral research also in the Sander Lab at EMBL and also received his doctorate in 1994; the two co-authored several papers with Sander, including a 1993 review of protein structure prediction and the PHD prediction server.

From 1994 to 1997 he was a postdoctoral researcher at EMBL, working on protein structure in the Sander Lab.

== Career ==
After his postdoctoral work, Schneider co-founded LION Bioscience AG in Heidelberg, where he was chief information officer and responsible for software development. As CEO of LION bioscience Research Inc. in Cambridge, Massachusetts, he set up an IT-based knowledge management system for Bayer's gene-based research and development.

He returned to EMBL as a team leader in the Structural and Computational Biology Unit (2004–2012), where he led the Data Integration and Knowledge Management group. From 2011 he was head of the Bioinformatics Core and Professor of Bioinformatics at the LCSB, University of Luxembourg, where he helped establish the centre's data and computational infrastructure. From 2017 he headed the Luxembourg node of ELIXIR. He co-founded ITTM S.A. (Information Technology for Translational Medicine) and was chairman of its board from 2015. He chaired the evaluation board of the ARISE programme. He advised the Frankfurt Institute for Advanced Studies (FIAS) and the Zuse Institute Berlin, and also the Barcelona Supercomputing Center. From 2015 he was a member of the Scientific Advisory Board of the de.NBI network and he was a member of the board of directors of the VPH Society, representing the LCSB. He was also a member of the board of directors of the International Society for Computational Biology (ISCB) and its treasurer for seven years.

== Research ==
Schneider's research focused on bioinformatics and computational biology, in particular the integration of protein structure and sequence data, as well as software infrastructure. In his early work at the EMBL, in Chris Sander's lab, he developed HSSP (Homology-derived Structures of Proteins). This created a database that merges protein structure and sequence information. HSSP aligns each protein of known three-dimensional structure in the Protein Data Bank to its likely sequence homologues. The goal was to allow structural information to be inferred for many more proteins than have been determined experimentally. The original approach in the 1991 publication increased the effective number of known protein structures roughly fivefold. The database was then updated in several later papers, with homologues identified by a profile-based alignment method called MaxHom. He continued by co-authoring PHD, creating an automatic mail server for protein secondary structure prediction.

Schneider co-developed a large-scale automated sequence analysis system which inspired the basis of LION's software offering.

At EMBL his lab's main focus was on data integration and data visualization. This led to the development of tools including BIO-Compendium, as well as the Arena3D, which served as a visualization tool . BIO-Compendium created a platform for analysing large-scale systems biology data. His group also developed Reflect, together with Seán O'Donoghue, Lars Juhl Jensen and colleagues. Reflect tags gene, protein and chemical names on web pages and in documents and links them to short summaries and related databases; it could be used as a browser plug-in or through an application programming interface. Reflect won first prize in the 2009 Elsevier Grand Challenge, and by 2010 more than 35,000 scientists had installed it. It was described in Web Semantics in 2010.

== Awards and honors ==
- Outstanding Contributions to the International Society for Computational Biology (ISCB) Award, 2022
- First prize, Elsevier Grand Challenge, 2009, shared with the Reflect development team

== Death and legacy ==
Schneider died on the 20th of August 2026, unexpectedly, at the age of 65.
Colleagues thanked him for his work on data integration and visualization and his leadership of the Luxembourg bioinformatics core. Lars Steinmetz of EMBL noted, "What made Reinhard stand out is that he brought a company executive style of leadership to the academic environment". Alfonso Valencia, also a former EMBL postdoc, remarked that Schneider "stood out as the one who was building for the future, foreseeing the big picture of what bioinformatics was going to become". The ARISE programme thanked him for his kindness, curiosity and open heart for science".
