= Christos Ouzounis =

Greek computational biologist

- Born: Christos A. Ouzounis; 1965 (age 60–61); Greece
- Education: Aristotle University of Thessaloniki (BSc); University of York (MSc, PhD)
- Scientific career
- Fields: Computational Biology; Systems Biomedicine; Bioinformatics; Evolution
- Workplaces: European Molecular Biology Laboratory; SRI International; European Bioinformatics Institute; King's College London; Centre for Research & Technology Hellas
- Thesis: The role of sequence conservation in the prediction of protein structure. (1993)
- Doctoral advisor: Chris Sander
- Website: bcplab.wordpress.com/who/director

Christos A. Ouzounis is a computational biologist, a director of research at the CERTH, and Professor of Bioinformatics at Aristotle University in Thessaloniki.

== Education ==
Ouzounis received his undergraduate degree (B.Sc.) in Biological Sciences from the Aristotle University of Thessaloniki (AUTH) in 1987. He then received an M.Sc. in Biological Computation from the University of York in 1988 and went on to perform doctoral work with Chris Sander at the European Molecular Biology Laboratory in Heidelberg, Germany receiving his PhD from the University of York in 1993.

== Career and research ==
After his PhD, Ouzounis was a Human Frontiers Science Program (HFSP) Postdoctoral fellow at SRI International, Menlo Park, California. Ouzounis started his own laboratory, researching computational genomics, at the European Molecular Biology Laboratory, European Bioinformatics Institute (EMBL-EBI) in 1996.

He then moved his laboratory to King's College London (KCL), as a Professor, Chair and Director of the KCL Centre for Bioinformatics in 2007. Following the restructuring at King's in 2009/2010, he returned to Greece, joining CPERI at CERTH in Thessaloniki. In 2020 he was appointed as Professor of Bioinformatics at AUTH. His research interests include genome structure, function and evolution, evolution of protein function, evolution of genetic information-processing systems, theory and applications of biological sequence comparison, data and knowledge representation for genomics, unsupervised machine learning in very large datasets, biologically-inspired hardware & software engineering (unpublished works), synthetic biology, exobiology, and science communication.

Some of his best known contributions in the field of computational genomics include automated sequence annotation, the discovery of genomic context methods, the inference of metabolic pathways from genome sequences, the development of methods for large-scale clustering of sequence similarities, the definition of the Last Universal Common Ancestor (LUCA) jointly with Nikos Kyrpides, and the quantification of horizontal gene transfer patterns across the "net of life". He also maintains a strong interest in the development of computational biology as an exemplary paradigm in the history of contemporary science, emanating from his first-hand experience that saw bioinformatics grow during the 1990s. He cites as mentors his late father Andreas Ouzounis†, Kostas Kastritsis†, Chris Sander, Antoine Danchin and Carl Woese†.

His former PhD students include David Kreil (2001), Anton Enright (2002) JM Peregrin-Alvarez (2003), Victor Kunin (2004) Nikos Darzentas (2005) and Ignat Drozdov (2010).

=== Awards and honours ===
Ouzounis is associate editor for the journal PLOS Computational Biology (since 2007). He is also an associate editor for the journal BioSystems and Honorary Editor for the journal Bioinformatics. He is a founding officer of the International Society for Computational Biology (ISCB), the Mikrobiokosmos initiative (Greece), the Hellenic Society for Computational Biology & Bioinformatics and Hellenic Bioinformatics. He is an active member of the MetaSUB consortium and a board member of Elixir-Europe. He was a visiting professor at the University of Toronto (2011-2014).
