= John Mattick =

Australian molecular biologist (born 1950)

Professor John Mattick AO, FAA, FTSE
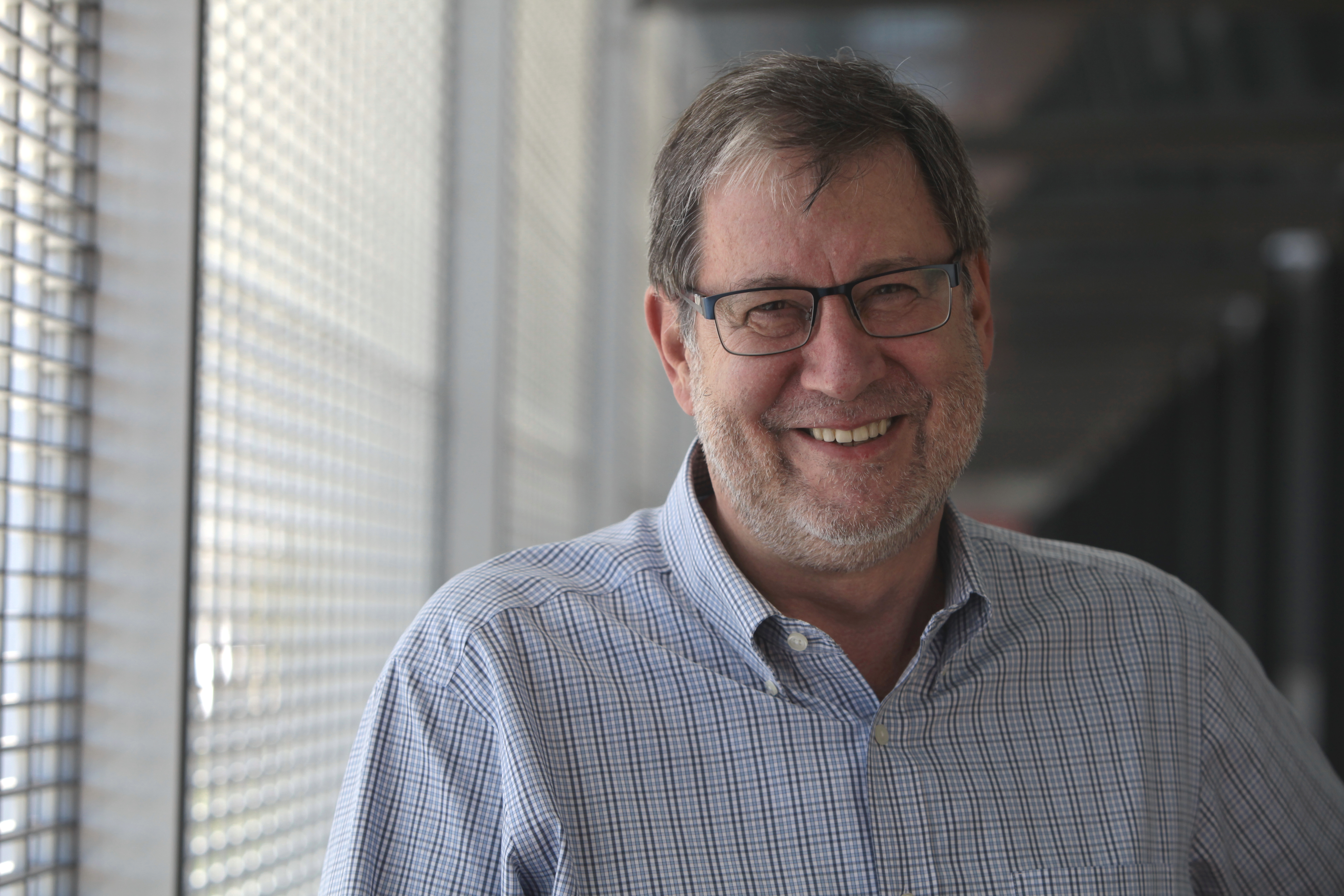
- John Mattick, pictured in 2014
- Born: John Stanley Mattick; 1950 (age 75–76)
- Education: St Patrick's College Strathfield
- Alma mater: University of Sydney; Monash University
- Known for: Assigning function to non-coding DNA
- Awards: Fellow of the Australian Academy of Science
- Scientific career
- Fields: Molecular biology
- Workplaces: Baylor College of Medicine; University of Cambridge; University of Oxford; University of Cologne; University of Strasbourg; CSIRO; The University of Queensland; Garvan Institute of Medical Research; Genomics England

John Stanley Mattick (born 1950, Sydney) is an Australian molecular biologist known for his efforts to assign function to non-coding DNA. Mattick was the executive director of the Garvan Institute of Medical Research from 2012 to 2018. He joined Genomics England in May 2018 as chief executive officer. In October 2019, he joined the University of New South Wales in Sydney.

== Career ==
Mattick received his high school education at St Patrick's College Strathfield. He obtained his Bachelor of Science degree from the University of Sydney and his PhD in biochemistry from Monash University. Subsequently, he worked at Baylor College of Medicine in Houston, the CSIRO Division of Molecular Biology in Sydney, and the University of Queensland, where he was based between 1988 and 2012.

Mattick has also worked at the Universities of Cambridge, Oxford, Cologne and Strasbourg. He was Foundation Director of the Australian Genome Research Facility, two ARC Special Research Centres and the Institute for Molecular Bioscience.

Mattick was appointed an Officer of the Order of Australia in 2001 for service to scientific research in the fields of molecular biology, genetics and biotechnology, particularly through the development and administration of research institutes and the Australian Genome Research Facility.

In 2007 he was elected an Associate Member of the European Molecular Biology Organisation and in 2008 elected a fellow of the Australian Academy of Science. More recently, he was awarded the Julian Wells Medal by the Lorne Genome Society in 2009 and the International Union of Biochemistry and Molecular Biology (IUBMB) Medal in 2011. He received the HUGO Chen Award for Distinguished Achievement in Genetic and Genomic Research in 2012, the same year he was appointed executive director of the Garvan Institute of Medical Research. He was elected Fellow of the Australian Academy of Health and Medical Sciences (FAHMS) in 2015 and was awarded the Lemberg Medal in 2017. In 2019, he won the Advance Global Impact Award.

Mattick served as Board Director for Arctoris Ltd, an Oxford-based technology company.
