= Gunnar von Heijne =

Swedish scientist (born 1951)

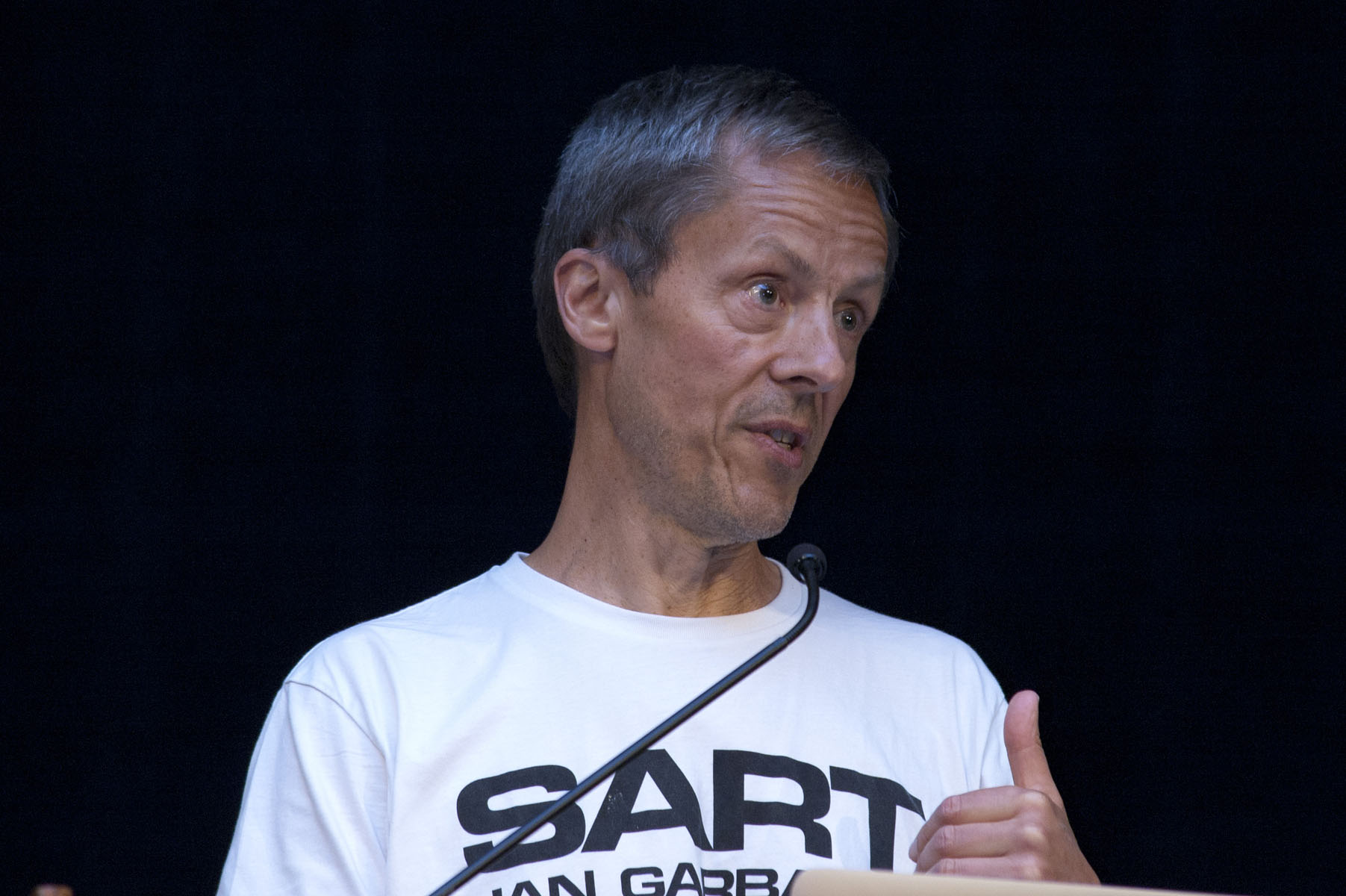
- Gunnar von Heijne at ISMB in 2012
- Born: Nils Gunnar Hansson von Heijne; 10 June 1951 (age 75)
- Awards: Arrhenius Plaque (1997); Björkénska priset (1998); Accomplishment by a Senior Scientist Award
- Scientific career
- Fields: Royal Institute of Technology
- Workplaces: Stockholm University, Karolinska Institutet

Professor Nils Gunnar Hansson von Heijne (born 10 June 1951 in Gothenburg) is a Swedish scientist working on signal peptides, membrane proteins and bioinformatics at the Stockholm Center for Biomembrane Research at Stockholm University.

== Education ==
Von Heijne graduated 1975 with a Master of Science degree in chemistry and chemical engineering from the Royal Institute of Technology (KTH). He then became a doctoral student in theoretical physics at KTH, in a research group focussing on statistical mechanics and theoretical biophysics, and was awarded his PhD in 1980. In 1983 he was made docent in theoretical biophysics at KTH, where he remained until 1988. 1982–1985 he was active as a science reporter at Sveriges Radio. 1989–1994 he was active at Karolinska Institutet, and in 1994 he was made a professor in theoretical chemistry at Stockholm University.

== Research ==
Von Heijne's research primarily concerns membrane proteins, and he is one of the most cited Swedish scientists in the areas of biochemistry and molecular biology. He heads the Center for Biomembrane Research at Stockholm University.

== Awards ==
In 2012 he was awarded the Accomplishment by a Senior Scientist Award by the International Society for Computational Biology.

von Heijne is a member of the Royal Swedish Academy of Sciences since 1997 and a member of the Nobel Committee for Chemistry from 2001 to 2009, and the Committees chairman from 2007 to 2009. In 2008, he received an honorary doctorate at Åbo Akademi.
