= Ross Overbeek =

American mathematician

Ross A. Overbeek
- Born: May 16, 1949 (age 77); Traverse City, Michigan
- Education: Pennsylvania State University
- Known for: automated theorem proving
- Scientific career
- Fields: Computer science; mathematical logic; bioinformatics
- Workplaces: Argonne National Laboratory
- Doctoral advisor: Wilson E. Singletary

Ross A. Overbeek (born May 16, 1949) is an American computer scientist with a long tenure at the Argonne National Laboratory. He has made important contributions to mathematical logic and genomics, as well as programming, particularly in database theory and the programming language Prolog.

== Early life ==
He grew up in Traverse City, Michigan where he struck up a lifelong friendship with R. W. Bradford, publisher of the libertarian periodical Liberty. He received a B.Ph. from Grand Valley State College, an M.S. from Pennsylvania State University in 1970, and a Ph.D. in computer science from Penn State in 1971. For the next 11 years he was a computer science professor at Northern Illinois University.

== Career ==
In the early 1970s a theorem prover named AURA, for AUtomated Reasoning Assistant, developed by Overbeek replaced one that had been the standard in the field.

In 1983 he joined the Mathematics and Computer Science Division of Argonne National Laboratory, working on automated theorem proving, logic programming, and parallel computation. In the 1980s he became interested in applying logic programming to molecular biology, and he was appointed to the Joint Information Task Force, a working group established to advise the National Institutes of Health and United States Department of Energy on the computational requirements of the Human Genome Initiative. He has helped develop multiple genomic databases including PUMA, WIT, ERGO, and SEED.

In 1998, Overbeek was one of several scientists who co-founded the company Integrated Genomics, Inc. with CEO Michael Fonstein. The company makes the ERGO database and analytics system.

In 2003, he co-founded the Fellowship for Interpretation of Genomes (FIG), a non-profit organization that coordinates the development of bioinformatics tools and comparative genomics research. In 2004, the FIG partnered with the Computation Institute, a joint Argonne Lab and University of Chicago institution, to establish the National Microbial Pathogen Data Resource Center with an $18 million federal grant.

== Published works ==
- American National Standard COBOL. with Wilson E. Singletary. McGraw-Hill. 1975. ISBN 978-0070574694.
- Overbeek, Ross A.; Singletary, Wilson E. (1983). Assembler language with ASSIST. Science Research Associates. ISBN 978-0574214355.
- Automated Reasoning: Introduction and Applications. with Larry Wos, Ewing Lusk, and Jim Boyle. Prentice-Hall. 1984. ISBN 978-0130544469.
- Portable Programs for Parallel Processors. with Ewing Lusk, James Boyle, Ralph Butler, Terrence Disz, Barnett Glickfeld, James Patterson, and Rick Stevens. Holt, Rinehart, and Winston. 1988. ISBN 978-0030141539.
- Overbeek R, Begley T, Butler RM, Choudhuri JV, Chuang HY, Cohoon M, et al. (2005-10-07). "The subsystems approach to genome annotation and its use in the project to annotate 1000 genomes". Nucleic Acids Research. 33 (17): 5691–5702. doi:10.1093/nar/gki866. PMC 1251668. PMID 16214803.
