= Betsy Foxman =

American epidemiologist

- Spouse: Michael Boehnke

Academic background
- Education: BSc, Conservation of Natural Resources, 1977, University of California, Berkeley; MSPH, Epidemiology, 1980, PhD, Epidemiology, 1983, UCLA Fielding School of Public Health.

Betsy Foxman (born 1955) is an American epidemiologist. She is the Hunein F. and Hilda Maassab Endowed Professor of Epidemiology and director of the Center for Molecular and Clinical Epidemiology of Infectious Diseases at the University of Michigan. She also served as Editor-in-Chief of the journal Interdisciplinary Perspectives on Infectious Diseases, is a member of the Infectious Disease Society of America and of the American College of Epidemiology.

Her research areas are the transmission, pathogenesis, ecology and evolution of infectious agents, and the transmission of antibiotic resistance among bacteria, particularly E. coli and Group B Streptococcus. Other interests are the role of oral microbiota in dental caries, viral infection and bacterial pneumonia, biofilm growth on medical devices and the dynamics of hospital pathogens. Foxman is a disciple of Darwinian medicine and believes that therapy can only be intelligently applied if the evolutionary history of pathogens is understood.

== Early life and education ==
Foxman was born in 1955. She earned a Bachelor of Science in Conservation of Natural Resources from the University of California, Berkeley and completed her Master's degree and PhD in Epidemiology from the UCLA Fielding School of Public Health.
