= Webb Miller =

American bioinformatician

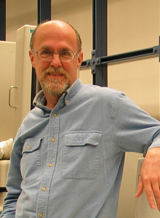
- Born: Webb Colby Miller; 1943 (age 82–83)
- Education: University of Washington Whitman College
- Known for: BLAST
- Awards: ISCB Senior Scientist Award; ISCB Fellow; IEEE Frances E. Allen Medal
- Scientific career
- Fields: Genomics; Bioinformatics; Evolution
- Workplaces: The Pennsylvania State University
- Thesis: Toward Abstract Numerical Analysis (1969)
- Website: www.bx.psu.edu/miller_lab

Webb Colby Miller (born 1943) is an American bioinformatician who is professor in the Department of Biology and the Department of Computer Science and Engineering at The Pennsylvania State University.

== Education ==
Miller attended Whitman College, and received his Ph.D. in mathematics from the University of Washington in 1969.

== Research and career ==
He joined Penn State in September 1985. Prior to that, he had held a position as permanent staff member at the IBM Thomas J. Watson Research Center and served on the faculty at the University of California, Santa Barbara, and the University of Arizona. He is a fellow of the ISCB (International Society for Computational Biology).

Miller has been developing algorithms and software for analyzing DNA sequences and related types of data from molecular genetics. He is one of the authors of BLAST. He also develops methods for aligning long DNA sequences and extracting functional information from them. Webb Miller has made important contributions to the analysis of many vertebrate genomes. He is regarded as one of the pioneers in the field of computational biology.

Webb Miller's recent research interests include the bioinformatics of species extinction, collaborating with Stephan Schuster, who is a Professor of Biochemistry and Molecular Biology at Penn State. In November 2008, they published a paper in Nature that described a draft sequence for the woolly mammoth genome.

== Awards ==
Miller was awarded the ISCB Senior Scientist Award and elected an ISCB Fellow by the International Society for Computational Biology in 2009. He is also among The 2009 Time 100. Together with Gene Myers, he received the Inaugural IEEE Frances E. Allen Medal "for pioneering contributions to sequence analysis algorithms and their applications to biosequence search, genome sequencing, and comparative genome analyses".
