= Michael Ashburner =

English biologist (1942–2023)

Michael Ashburner FRS MAE
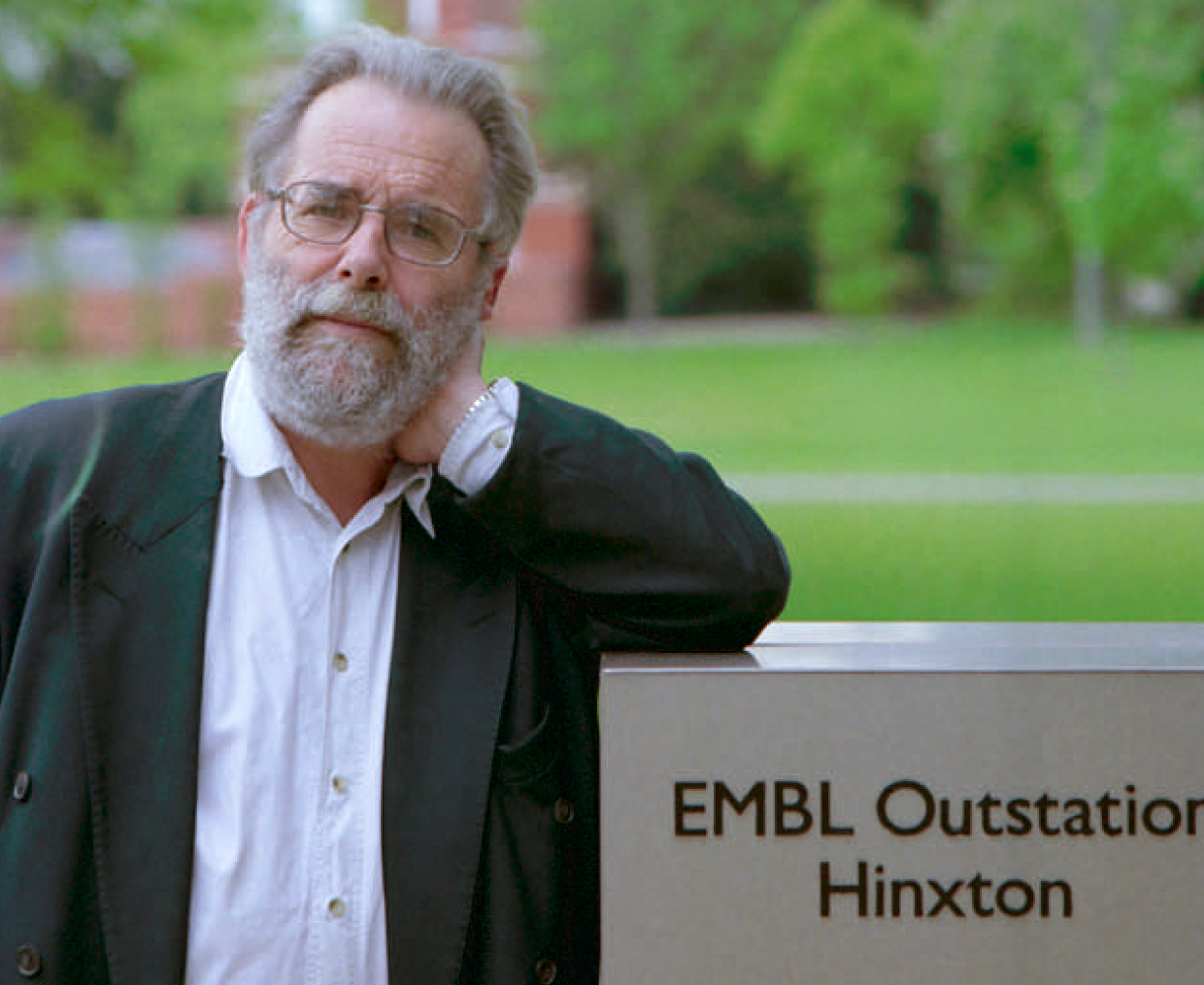
- Michael Ashburner
- Born: 23 May 1942; Brighton, Sussex, England
- Died: 7 July 2023 (aged 81)
- Education: High Wycombe Grammar School; University of Cambridge (BA, PhD)
- Known for: Drosophila melanogaster research; Gene Ontology; FlyBase
- Spouse: Francesca Ryan (m. 1963)
- Awards: Thomas Hunt Morgan Medal (2008); George W. Beadle Award (1999); Benjamin Franklin Award (2006); Senior Scientist Award (2011)
- Scientific career
- Fields: Genetics; Bioinformatics; Drosophilist
- Workplaces: European Bioinformatics Institute; University of California, San Francisco; California Institute of Technology; University of Cambridge
- Thesis: Studies on puffing in the salivary gland chromosomes of Drosophila (1968)
- Doctoral advisor: Alan Henderson
- Website: www.gen.cam.ac.uk/research-groups/ashburner

Michael Ashburner FRS MAE (23 May 1942 – 7 July 2023) was an English biologist and Professor in the Department of Genetics at University of Cambridge. He also served as joint-head and co-founder of the European Bioinformatics Institute of the European Molecular Biology Laboratory and a Fellow of Churchill College, Cambridge.

== Education ==
Born in Brighton, Sussex, England, Ashburner was educated at the Royal Grammar School, High Wycombe from 1953 to 1960. He studied the Natural Sciences Tripos at the University of Cambridge as an undergraduate student of Churchill College, Cambridge, receiving his Bachelor of Arts degree in Genetics in 1964. His PhD was supervised by Alan Henderson and awarded in 1968, followed by a Doctor of Science in 1978.

== Research and career ==
Most of Ashburner's research was on the model organism Drosophila melanogaster. Ashburner's career began in the early period of molecular biology prior to the development of most of the recombinant DNA techniques in use today, such as Northern/Southern/Western blotting. Nevertheless, by observing patterns of "puffing" in polytene chromosomes, he established the existence of a cascade of genetic controls in the post-larval development triggered by ecdysone. The Ashburner model of 1974 became a paradigm for metazoan gene regulation inasmuch as the Jacob-Monod model did for prokaryotes. Ashburner collaborated widely and mentored numerous PhD students and postdoctoral research students during his career.

Ashburner was also a member of the consortium that eventually sequenced and annotated the Drosophila melanogaster genome. Ashburner's recollections of the sequencing of the D. melanogaster genome forms the basis of a book entitled "Won for All: How the Drosophila Genome Was Sequenced". A prolonged effort by his laboratory to characterise the Adh region became invaluable for validating annotation strategies when large-scale genome information became available. Ashburner and his colleagues have received funding from the Biotechnology and Biological Sciences Research Council (BBSRC), the Medical Research Council (MRC) and Engineering and Physical Sciences Research Council (EPSRC) for their studies on Drosophila genomics leveraging the D. melanogaster genome and its annotation.

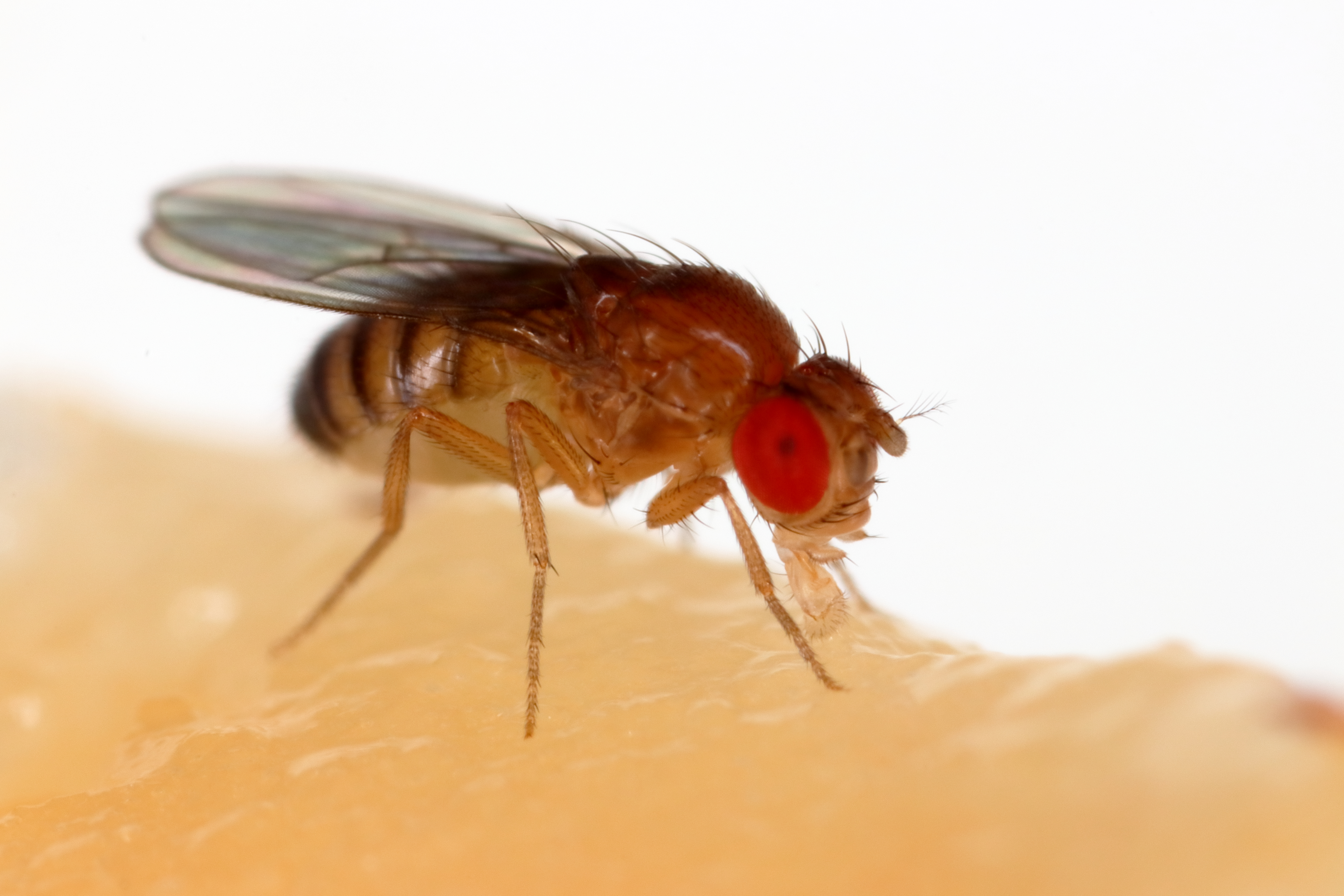
Drosophila melanogaster, the object of Ashburner's science

=== Computational biology ===
Ashburner was also an early pioneer in the application of computers to biology. His contributions include his active participation in setting up FlyBase and the development of Open Biomedical Ontologies to allow machine-searchable annotation of biological information, particularly the Gene Ontology and ChEBI. He was instrumental in establishing the European Bioinformatics Institute, as well as securing its location in the UK, and acted as the first head of the European Bioinformatics Institute jointly with Graham Cameron.

=== Open science advocacy ===
As part of his involvement the sequencing of the D. melanogaster genome, Ashburner played an instrumental role in ensuring that the resulting sequence and annotations would be made publicly available. Additionally, Ashburner made a strong case for the human genome published in Science in 2000 by Celera Genomics to be made freely available, and spoke out repeatedly against the privatization of genomic resources. Ashburner was also one of the signatories of the first open letter to Science in 2001 calling for a centralized, open repository of the scientific literature, and subsequently became a strong advocate of Open Access publishing, speaking out for this cause in the scientific literature and popular media. He also provided written evidence to the UK Parliament Select Committee on Science and Technology supporting Open Access publishing and served on the initial advisory board of UK PubMed Central, the first global mirror site of the PubMed Central repository of freely available biological literature.

=== Awards and honours ===
Ashburner was elected a Foreign Honorary Member of the American Academy of Arts and Sciences in 1993. He received the Gregor Mendel Medal from the Academy of Sciences, Czech Republic in 1998, the first George W. Beadle Award of the Genetics Society of America in 1999, an honorary Doctorate from the University of Crete in 2002, an honorary Doctor of Science from the University of Edinburgh in 2003, the Genetics Society Medal of the UK Genetics Society in 2005 and the Franklin Award of the Bioinformatics Organization in 2006. Ashburner was elected a Fellow of the Royal Society (FRS) in 1990, his certificate of election reads:

"Distinguished for his wide-ranging researches on the cytology, genetics and evolution of Drosophila melanogaster. He was the first to make a comprehensive map of puffs in the salivary gland polytene chromosomes and to define the stage at which each was expressed. He went on to demonstrate the effects of various stimuli, especially heat-shock and ecdysone, on puffing at specific loci, and correlated particular puffs with particular gene products. Combining genetic, cytological and molecular methodology, he has investigated in fine detail particular chromosome regions, especially that surrounding the Adh (alcohol dehydrogenase) gene, revealing many novel features of structure and function. He has also made important contributions to the understanding of evolution and speciation within the D.melanogaster group of species. Ashburner has unique standing as a scholar and authority in the whole area of Drosophila research."

Ashburner was awarded Member of the Academia Europaea (MAE) in 1989.

== Personal life ==
Ashburner married Francesca Ryan and had one son and two daughters, Rebecca, Geoffrey and Isabel. He died on 7 July 2023, at the age of 81.

Academic offices
Preceded by -	Joint Director of the European Bioinformatics Institute (with Graham Cameron); 1992–2001	Succeeded by Janet Thornton
