= Ruth Nussinov =

Bioinformatician

- רותי נוסינוב
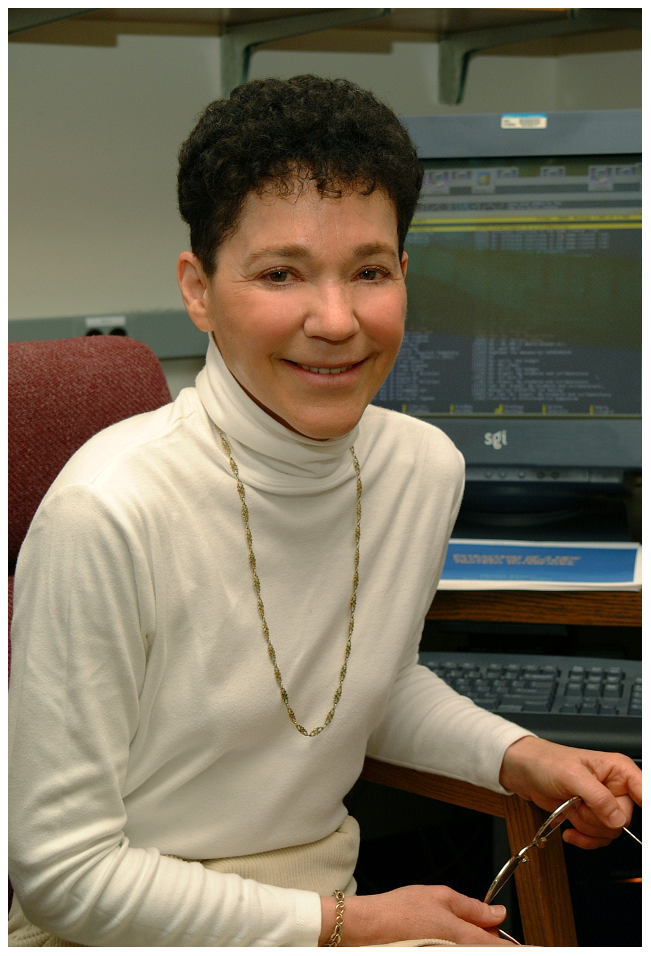
- Education: University of Washington, Rutgers University
- Known for: RNA structural prediction, Nussinov algorithm, Nussinov plots, Molecular recognition, Allostery, Dynamic conformations determine protein function and cell phenotype, Conformational selection and population shift, Dynamic allostery, Protein–protein interaction prediction
- Awards: National Academy of Sciences (2025); European Molecular Biology Organization (EMBO) member (2024); American Institute for Medical and Biological Engineering (AIMBE) Fellow (2021); American Physical Society Fellow Award (2020); ISCB Senior Scientist Award (2018); ISCB Fellow (2013); Biophysical Society Fellow Award (2011)
- Scientific career
- Fields: Bioinformatics, Computational structural biology, Biophysics
- Workplaces: Weizmann Institute, Berkeley, Harvard, Tel Aviv University, NCI
- Thesis: Secondary structure analysis of nucleic acids (1977)
- Website: Official website

Ruth Nussinov (Hebrew: רותי נוסינוב) is an Israeli-American biologist born in Rehovot who was a professor in the Department of Human Genetics, School of Medicine at Tel Aviv University and is the senior principal scientist and principal investigator at the National Cancer Institute, National Institutes of Health. Nussinov is also the editor in chief of the Current Opinion in Structural Biology and formerly of the journal PLOS Computational Biology. She was elected a member of the National Academy of Sciences in 2025.

In 1978, Nussinov proposed the first dynamic programming approach for nucleic acid secondary structure prediction, this method is now known as the Nussinov algorithm.

Her most important discovery was in the 1990s. In 1999 Nussinov published the transformational concept that all conformations preexist—even if the crystal captures only one—and that evolution harnesses their dynamic interconversion for function, dispelling the dogma that only the wild-type shape is relevant. Nussinov suggested a vastly different scenario from the-then dogma of two, "open" and "closed" conformations proposed by Monod, Wyman, and Changeux. She proposed that there is not one folded form, nor two—as they suggested—but many different forms, and in equilibrium, the system keeps jumping between them, and that this barrier-crossing is function. The concept that she suggested is significant since it explained that rather than the ligand inducing a conformational change (as in induced fit), the ligand can select a preexisting (relatively rare, non-minimal energy) conformation in the system that may be better suited to dock it, with minor optimization. It will then bind the ligand, and the equilibrium will keep producing more of this conformation to compensate, which she suggested (also in 1999), is the allosteric effect. This foundational "conformational selection and population shift" idea as an alternative to the "induced fit" text-book model explains the mechanism of molecular recognition. The dynamic shifts among conformations explain catalysis (2000), regulation, kinase activation, and allosteric drugs actions. Her concept was confirmed by innumerable experiments and is now widely established. As Nussinov and others have shown since, this paradigm helps unravel diverse processes as signaling, regulation, and aggregation in amyloid diseases, and oncogenic transformation, contributing to extraordinary advancements in understanding structure and function.

For her contributions to the broad area of molecular recognition and allostery, she has been recognized as Pioneer in Molecular Biology.

Nussinov has authored over 750 scientific papers with over 80,000 citations in Google Scholar, and has given hundreds of invited talks. Most recently, she pioneered the connection, on the structural and cellular levels, of cancer and neurodevelopmental disorders asking How can same-gene mutations promote both cancer and developmental disorders?.

A personal scientific overview of her biography has been published in 2018 as "Autobiography of Ruth Nussinov". Her scientific biography highlighting her accomplishments has been published in 2025 as Pioneer in Molecular Biology.

Ruth Nussinov was elected to the National Academy of Sciences (See CCR and IRP websites).

== Education ==
Ruth Nussinov received her BSc in microbiology from University of Washington in 1966, her MSc in biochemistry from Rutgers University in 1967. After an 8-year break to have 3 children, she went back to school in 1975, and received her Ph.D. in biochemistry from Rutgers University in 1977. Her thesis was titled Secondary structure analysis of nucleic acids.

== Career ==
She was a postdoctoral fellow at the Weizmann Institute (1977-1980) and subsequently a visiting scientist at Berkeley and at Harvard. Nussinov was in the Computer Science Department of Tel Aviv University as a senior lecturer. She took a position in Tel Aviv University Medical School in 1984 as associate professor and was promoted to professor in 1990, where she is now Professor Emeritus.

Her association with the NIH started in 1983, first with the National Institute of Child Health and Human Development and, since 1985, with the National Cancer Institute. Nussinov is a senior principal investigator in the Cancer Innovation Laboratory since 1985. She is also an adjunct professor in the Department of Chemistry and Biochemistry at University of Maryland since 2016.

She is the editor in chief of the journal Current Opinion in Structural Biology and formerly of PLOS Computational Biology. She also served on the editorial boards of the journals Biophysical Journal, Physical Biology, Proteins, BMC Bioinformatics and the Journal of Biological Chemistry.

== Awards and fellowships ==
- Elected Fellow of the Biophysical Society for "extraordinary contributions to advances in computational biology on both nucleic acids and proteins" (2011)
- Distinguished Ulam Scholar, The Center for Nonlinear Studies (CNLS), Los Alamos National Labs (2012)
- Elected Fellow of the International Society for Computational Biology (ISCB) (2013)
- Theodore von Kármán Fellow Award (2015)
- Special Lifetime Award, The Israeli Society for Bioinformatics and Computational Biology (ISBCB) (2015)
- Computational Molecular Medicine: A minisymposium dedicated to Ruth Nussinov (2015)
- KeyLab Award for "outstanding achievements in biomolecular simulations in translational medicine" (2018)
- ISCB Accomplishments by a Senior Scientist Award (2018)
- Annual Achievement Award, Frederick National Laboratory for Cancer Research (2020)
- ACS Fall 2020 meeting "Dynamic ensembles, cell signaling and drug discovery: A symposium in honor of Ruth Nussinov (2020)
- Elected Fellow of American Physical Society (APS) (2021)
- Ruth Nussinov Festschrift, American Chemical Society (ACS) (2021)
- The American Institute for Medical and Biological Engineering (AIMBE) College of Fellows Class of 2021 (Medical and biological engineering elite) (2021)
- Elected EMBO member (2024)
- Elected the National Academy of Sciences (2025)

== Scientific accomplishments ==
In 1978, Nussinov published a dynamic programming algorithm for RNA secondary structure prediction, which has since been the leading method. It has since been taught in bioinformatics and computational biology classes in Europe and the US, it is included in books, and exploited in multiple software packages.

Besides her work on nucleic acid secondary structure prediction, Nussinov is also regarded as a pioneer in DNA sequence analysis for her work in the early 1980s seeking genome-encoded functional signals, later becoming a trend.

In the 1990s Nussinov pioneered the role of dynamic conformational ensembles in function, with distinct conformational states and their propensities indicators of protein and cell phenotype, and of allosteric drugs actions. She proposed that all conformations pre-exist, and the model of "conformational selection and population shift" as an alternative to "induced fit" to explain molecular recognition. The concept that she introduced emphasized that all conformational states preexist, available for a range of ligands to bind, followed by re-equilibration (shift) of the ensemble. It also clarified how allosteric posttranslational modifications can work, and underscored that lipids, ions and water molecules can also act via allostery. She also proposed that all dynamic proteins are allosteric, the role of allostery in disease, and how allosteric drugs work at the fundamental level. The paradigm that she introduced has impacted the scientific community's views and strategies in allosteric drug design, biomolecular engineering, molecular evolution, and cell signaling. In line with Nussinov's proposition, dynamic population shifts are now broadly recognized as the origin of allostery. It also explains the effects of allosteric, disease-related activating mutations.

The concepts that her group pioneered have impacted the way biophysicists and structural biologists think about protein-ligand interactions. The conformational selection/population shift mechanism is now widely established. As Nussinov and others have shown, the new paradigm helps unravel processes as diverse as signaling, catalysis, gene regulation, and aggregation in amyloid diseases, and recently, the mechanisms of activating mutations in cancer, and addressing the puzzling question of how same-gene mutations can promote both cancer and neurodevelopmental disorders.
