= Temple F. Smith =

American academic

Temple Smith
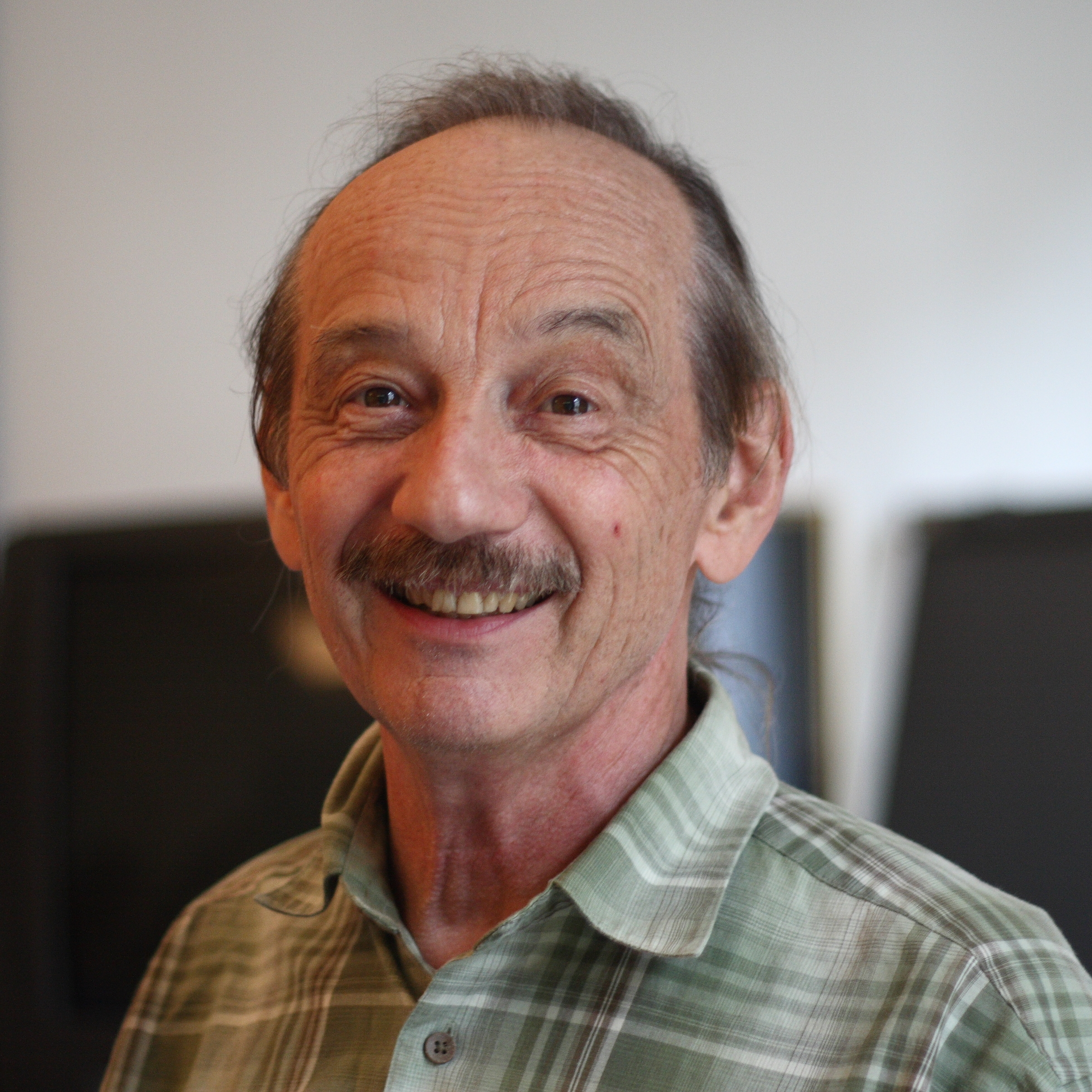
- Temple Smith at Yale in 2008
- Born: Temple Ferris Smith; March 7, 1939 (age 87); Auburn, New York
- Education: Purdue University; University of Colorado Boulder (PhD)
- Known for: Smith-Waterman algorithm
- Awards: ISCB Senior Scientist Award (2007)
- Scientific career
- Workplaces: Boston University
- Thesis: The deuteron amplitudes from a composite particle nuclear scattering theory (1969)
- Website: www.bu.edu/eng/profile/temple-f-smith-ph-d/

Temple Ferris Smith (born March 7, 1939) is an emeritus professor in biomedical engineering who developed the Smith-Waterman algorithm with Michael Waterman in 1981. The Smith-Waterman algorithm serves as the basis for multi sequence comparisons, identifying the segment with the maximum local sequence similarity, see sequence alignment. This algorithm is used for identifying similar DNA, RNA and protein segments. He was director of the BioMolecular Engineering Research Center at Boston University for twenty years and is now professor emeritus.

== Education ==
Smith obtained his bachelor's degree in 1963 from the Physics Department, Purdue University, followed by a PhD in 1969 in the Physics Department, University of Colorado at Boulder.

== Research and career ==
After his PhD, Smith did postdoctoral research from March 1969 to August 1971 in the Department of Biophysics and Genetics, University of Colorado Medical School, Boulder.

His research is centered on the application of various computer science and mathematical methods for the discovery of the syntactic and semantic patterns in nucleic acid and amino acid sequences. In recent years this has focus on molecular evolution of protein families. such as the WD-repeat beta propellers, translation associated GTPase, and the ribosomal proteins. He is known for the creation of the Smith-Waterman algorithm.

Smith has held the following appointments:

- 1965–1966: Instructor, US Air Force Lowery, Denver, CO
- 1971–1984: Professor, Department of Physics, Northern Michigan University, Marquette, MI
- 1985–1991: Director, Molecular Biology Computer Research Resource, Dana-Farber Cancer Institute, Harvard Medical School and the Harvard School of Public Health
- 1991–2009: Director, BioMolecular Engineering Resource Center, Boston University
- 1999– : Co-organizer, 1999 Institute for the Academic Advancement of Youth Discovering Biotechnology Day
- 2000– : Co-Founder and Chief Information Officer, Modular Genetics, Inc.
- 2000– : Youth Hockey Coach

=== Selected publications ===
- M. Mariotti, T. F. Smith, P. H. Sudmant and G. Goldberger, "Pseudogenization of testis-specific Lfg5 predates human/Neanderthal divergence", Journal of Human Genetics 59, 288–291 (2014)
- Hyman Hartman and Temple F. Smith "The Evolution of the Ribosome and the Genetic Code", Life, 4(2), 227–249 (2014)
- Hartman, H and T. F. Smith, "GTPases and the origin of the ribosome", Biology Direct, 5:36-39, (2010)
- Hartman, Hyman and Smith, Temple F. "The evolution of the cilium and the eukaryotic cell" Cell Motility and the Cytoskeleton.66: 215–219. (2009)
- Hu, Lan, Smith, Temple F. and Goldberger, Gabriel. "LFG: a candidate apoptosis regulatory gene family" Apoptosis. 14: 1255–1265. (2009)
- Smith, Temple F., Lee, Jung C., Gutell, Robin R. and Hartman, Hyman. "The Origin and Evolution of the Ribosome" Biology Direct 3: 16, 1–13 (2008)
- Smith, Temple F. "Chapter 2: Diversity of WD-Repeat Proteins" The Coronin Family of Proteins, 20–30 (2008)
- Bhutkar, Arjun V., Gelbart, William M. and Smith, Temple F. (2007). Inferring genome-scale rearrangement phylogeny and ancestral gene order: A Drosophila case study. Genome Biology 8, R236
- Bhutkar, Arjun, Russo, Susan M., Smith, Temple F. and Gelbart, William M. "Genome-Scale Analysis of Positionally Relocated Genes" Genome Research 17: 1880-1887 (2007)
- Hartman, Hyman, Favaretto, Paola and Smith, Temple F. "The Archaeal Origins of the Eukaryotic Translational System" Archaea 2: 1-9 (2006)
- Bienkowska, Jadwiga, Hartman, Hyman and Smith, Temple F. (2003). A search method for homologs of small proteins, Ubiquitin-like proteins in prokaryotic cells? Protein Engineering 16 (12), 897–904.
- Venkatesan, Kavitha, McManus, Heather R., Mello, Craig C., Smith, Temple F. and Hansen, Ulla. (2003). Functional conservation between members of an ancient duplicated transcription factor family, LSF/Grainyhead. Nucleic Acids Research 31(15), 4304–4316.
- Zhang YX1, Fox JG, Ho Y, Zhang L, Stills HF Jr, Smith TF. Comparison of the major outer-membrane protein (MOMP) gene of mouse pneumonitis (MoPn) and hamster SFPD strains of Chlamydia trachomatis with other Chlamydia strains. Mol Biol Evol. 1993 Nov;10(6):1327–42.
- Figge J, Smith TF. Cell division sequence motif. Nature 334 (6178), 109 (14 July 1988) |pmid=3290690 |doi=10.1038/334109a0.

== Awards and honors ==
Smith was awarded the ISCB Senior Scientist Award and elected ISCB Fellow in 2009 by the International Society for Computational Biology.

Im 2002, he was inducted into American Institute for Medical and Biological Engineering (AIMBE) "for extraordinary contributions in defining and advancing the field of bioinformatics, with emphasis on novel engineering methods to predict protein structure and function".
