= David Eisenberg =

American biochemist and biophysicist (born 1939)

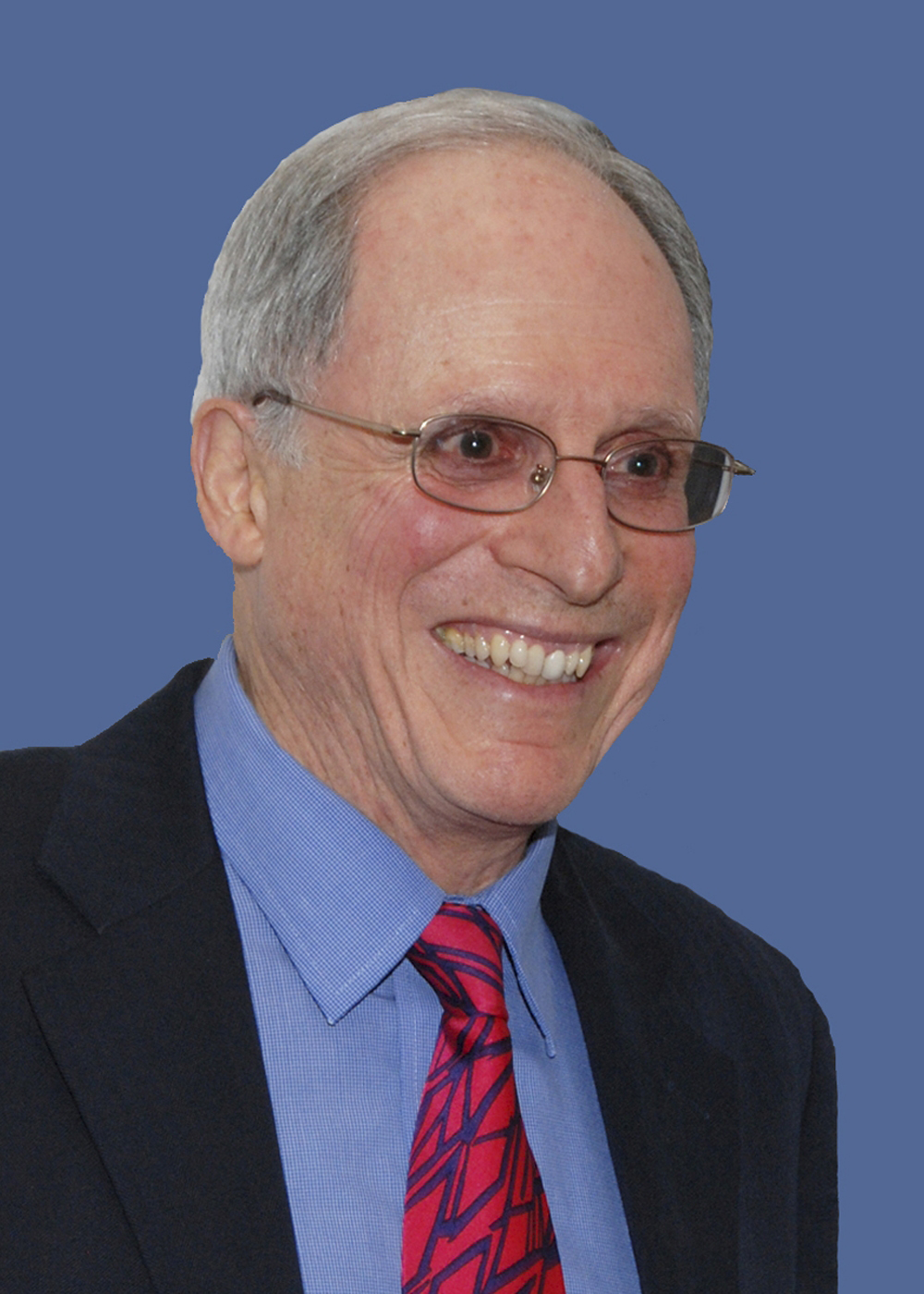
- David Eisenberg
- Born: March 15, 1939 (age 87); Chicago, Illinois, US
- Education: Harvard University (undergraduate); The Queen's College, Oxford (postgraduate)
- Awards: Harvey Prize (2008); ISCB Senior Scientist Award (2013)
- Scientific career
- Fields: Proteins; Amyloid; Structural biology
- Workplaces: Howard Hughes Medical Institute; University of Oxford; University of California, Los Angeles; Harvard University; California Institute of Technology; Princeton University
- Thesis: Some problems in the electronic structure of molecules (1965)
- Doctoral advisor: Charles Coulson
- Notable students: Charlotte Deane (postdoctoral fellow); Michael Gribskov (postdoctoral fellow)
- Website: eisenberglab.mbi.ucla.edu; www.hhmi.org/research/investigators/eisenberg_bio.html

David S. Eisenberg (born 15 March 1939) is an American biochemist and biophysicist best known for his contributions to structural biology and computational molecular biology. He has been a professor at the University of California, Los Angeles since the early 1970s and was director of the UCLA-DOE Institute for Genomics & Proteomics, as well as a member of the California NanoSystems Institute (CNSI) at UCLA.

== Education ==
Eisenberg attended Harvard College and graduated in 1961 with an A.B. in Biochemical Sciences. He went on to the University of Oxford, where he was awarded a D.Phil in 1965 for research supervised by Charles Coulson.

== Research ==
Eisenberg's current research focuses on the structural biology of amyloidogenic proteins, while his computational efforts largely center on the development of bioinformatic/proteomic methodologies for elucidation and analysis of protein interaction networks. His research group hosts the Database of Interacting Proteins.

== Career ==
- Postdoctoral research, Princeton University (1964–1966; with Walter Kauzmann)
- Postdoctoral research, California Institute of Technology (1966–1969; with Richard E. Dickerson)
- Professor, Department of Chemistry & Biochemistry, UCLA, USA (1969–Present)
- Professor, Department of Biological Chemistry, UCLA Medical School
- Director, UCLA-DOE Institute for Genomics & Proteomics (1993–2014)
- Member, California NanoSystems Institute (CNSI), UCLA
- Investigator, Howard Hughes Medical Institute (2001–Present)

== Awards ==
He was the recipient of Harvey Prize (Human Health) 2008 in recognition of his contributions in unfolding the structure of amyloid fibrils. The award was presented to him at a ceremony that took place on March 23, 2009 at the Technion. This recently recognized protein state provides opportunities to understand cells in health and disease.

- 1961 - L.J. Henderson Prize
- 1958-1960 - Harvard College Honorary Scholarships
- 1961-1964 - Rhodes Scholarship
- 1972-1977 - USPHS Career Development Award
- 1975 - UCLA Distinguished Teaching Award
- 1982 - McCoy Award of the UCLA Department of Chemistry and Biochemistry for innovative research
- 1989 - Member, National Academy of Sciences (Biophysics & Computational Biology section)
- 1992 - Pierce Award of the Immunotoxin Society
- 1996 - Protein Society Stein & Moore Award
- 1998 - American Chemical Society Repligen Corporation Award in Chemistry of Biological Processes
- 2000 - Investigator, Howard Hughes Medical Institute
- 2000 - Amgen Award of the Protein Society
- 2001 - Fellow, American Association for the Advancement of Science
- 2003 - Member, American Philosophical Society
- 2004 - UCLA Glenn T. Seaborg Medal
- 2005 - Harvard University's Westheimer Medal
- 2008 - ACS Nobel Laureate Signature Award for Graduate Education in Chemistry (as preceptor, student was Rebecca Anne Nelson)
- 2013 - ISCB (International Society for Computational Biology) Senior Scientist Award
- 2020 - Passano Award
