= Cristen Willer =

American-Canadian bioinformatician and geneticist

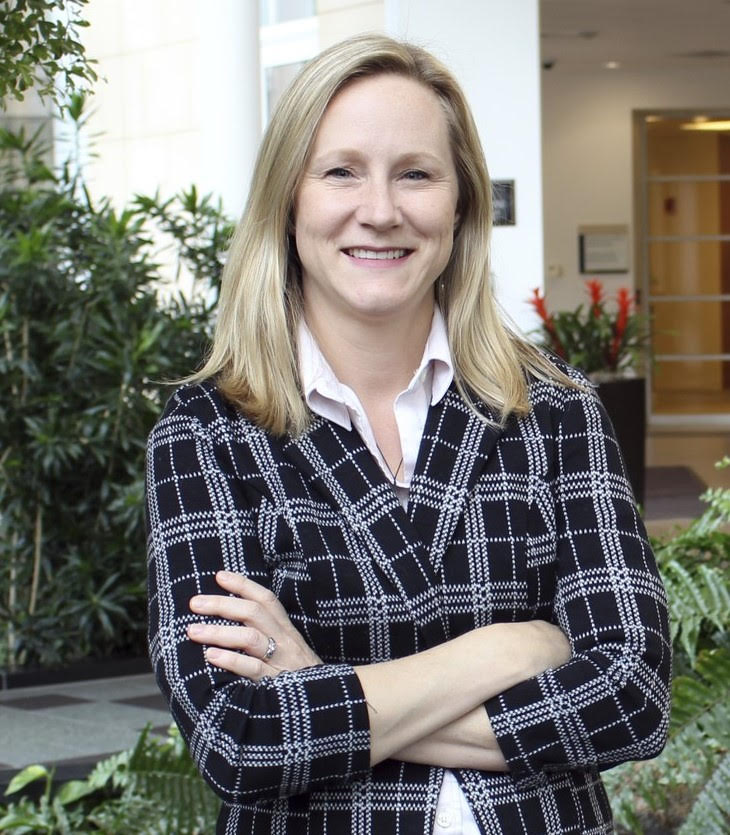
- Born: 1976 (age 49–50); Niagara Falls, Ontario, Canada
- Spouse: Gonçalo Abecasis

Academic background
- Education: Bsc, 1998, McMaster University; PhD, 2003, University of Oxford
- Thesis: Genetic and environmental susceptibility to multiple sclerosis (2003)

Cristen Jennifer Willer (born 1976) is an American-Canadian bioinformatician and geneticist. She works at Regeneron Pharmaceuticals, and was formerly, until 2022, the Frank N Wilson Professor of Internal Medicine, Human Genetics, and Computational Medicine and Bioinformatics at the University of Michigan.

== Early life and education ==
Willer was born in 1976 in Niagara Falls, Ontario, to parents Barry Willer and Sheelagh Brooks Willer. She was raised in Fort Erie, Ontario and earned her Bachelor of Science degree from McMaster University. Upon graduating from McMaster in 1998, Willer enrolled at Oxford University for her PhD (completed in 2003) and completed her Postdoctoral Research at the University of Michigan (UMich) from 2004 until 2010.

As a research fellow in the Department of Biostatistics, Willer was the co-first author on an international study which found seven new genes that influence blood cholesterol levels and confirmed 11 other genes previously thought to influence cholesterol. Later in the year, she also helped identify 12 new genes as potential new drug targets to battle glucose levels and diabetes. In addition to the six new genes, another study also confirmed that genes that predispose people to obesity act in the brain.

== Career ==
Upon completing her research fellowship, Willer applied for an R01 grant from the National Institutes of Health to propose a statistical study to search for genes related to blood cholesterol levels. She earned the grant and also became a member of UMich's Biological Sciences Scholars Program. She then joined the University of Michigan Medical School through their Biological Sciences Scholars Program in 2011. In 2013, Willer was appointed an assistant professor of internal medicine, human genetics and computational medicine and bioinformatics at the University of Michigan Medical School. While serving in this role, she held a Pathway to Independence Award from the National Heart, Lung, and Blood Institute which assisted in funding her research into genes that influence heart disease risk. Alongside graduate students Ellen Schmidt and Sebanti Sengupta, her research team found 157 gene-changes in human DNA that alter the levels of cholesterol and other blood fats that could lead to new medications. In recognition of her biomedical science research, Willer was the recipient of the 2015 Dean's Basic Science Research Award. At their annual meeting in 2021, Dr. Willer was awarded the Early Career Award from the American Society of Human Genetics. In December 2024, Dr. Willer had published ~240 scientific articles which had been cited a combined ~95,000 times and she had an h-index of 101.

In 2022, Dr. Willer joined the Regeneron Genetics Center of Regeneron Pharmaceuticals as a Senior Director of Genomics and Health Data Mining.

Until 2022, Dr. Willer was a Professor of Internal Medicine, Human Genetics, and Computational Medicine and Bioinformatics, during which time Willer was the senior author of two publications in the journal Nature Genetics which found that coding variants explain about 1/3 of the lipid loci in Europeans. She also made new genetic discoveries from several heart disease studies, including on congenital heart defects, aortic aneurysm, atrial fibrillation and blood lipid levels.

In 2013, Dr. Willer launched a biorepository at the University of Michigan known as the CHIP biobank: the Cardiovascular Health Improvement Project, which focused on consenting and collecting blood samples from patients with aortic aneurysm and other cardiovascular diseases. In 2018, Willer launched the Michigan Racial Equality and Community Health (MREACH) program, a biobank "to help drive future genetic research towards studying diseases that disproportionately affect minorities and ensuring that future prevention strategies are optimized for minority individuals." She was also appointed to work on the genome-wide association study, a team which identified 111 loci, 80 of them new, for Atrial fibrillation (A-fib). As the senior co-author, Willer helped compile a genetic "risk score" in order to prioritize patients at a higher risk for A-fib and discovered that people who develop A-fib early in life carry more of the risk genes than those who develop it later. During the COVID-19 pandemic, Willer and her research team identified 76 notable variants with potential, 11 of which were previously unreported, genes as possible future targets to address cardiovascular risk without affecting the liver or causing other metabolic disorders. She also continued leading the MREACH program.

== Personal life ==
Cristen Willer is married to biomedical researcher Gonçalo Abecasis. They have five children.
