= Eugene Myers =

American scientist

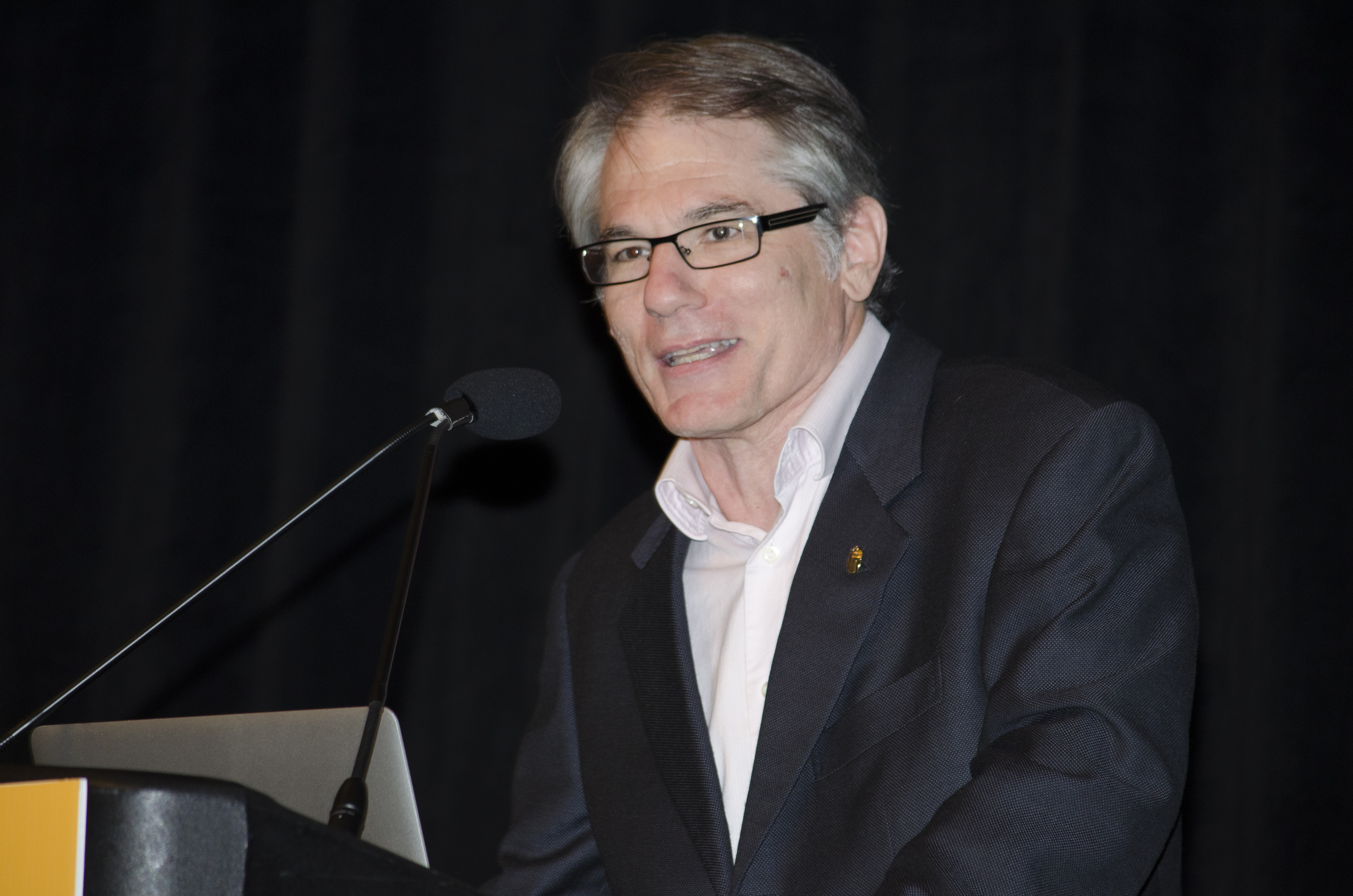
- Myers speaking at ISMB 2014
- Born: Eugene Wimberly Myers; December 31, 1953 (age 72); Boise, Idaho, U.S.
- Education: University of Colorado Boulder; California Institute of Technology
- Awards: Kanellakis Award (2001); ISCB Senior Scientist Award (2014)
- Scientific career
- Fields: Computer science Bioinformatics
- Workplaces: MPI-CBG; Janelia Farm Research Campus; University of Arizona
- Thesis: A Depth-First search characterization of K-connectivity and its application to connectivity testing (1982)
- Doctoral advisor: Andrzej Ehrenfeucht
- Website: www.mpi-cbg.de/research-groups/current-groups/gene-myers/

Eugene Wimberly "Gene" Myers Jr. (born December 31, 1953) is an American computer scientist and bioinformatician, who is best known for contributing to the early development of the National Center for Biotechnology Information's BLAST tool for sequence analysis.

== Education ==
Myers received his Bachelor of Science in mathematics from the California Institute of Technology and a Doctor of Philosophy in computer science from the University of Colorado Boulder.

== Research ==
Myers' 1990 paper (with Stephen Altschul and others) describing BLAST has received over 62,000+ citations making it amongst the most highly cited papers ever. Along with Udi Manber, Myers invented the suffix array data structure.

Myers was a member of the faculty of the University of Arizona, the Vice President of Informatics Research at Celera Genomics, and a member of the faculty at University of California, Berkeley. At Celera Genomics, Myers was involved in the sequencing of the human genome, as well as the genomes of Drosophila and mouse. In particular, Myers advocated the use of the whole genome shotgun sequencing technique. Later, he became group leader at the Janelia Farm Research Campus (JFRC) of the Howard Hughes Medical Institute. In 2012, Myers moved to Dresden to become one of the directors of the Max Planck Institute of Molecular Cell Biology and Genetics. He leads a center for systems biology.

Myers' current research interests include computational reconstructions of neuroanatomical data, algorithms for analysis of functional neuroscience data, and genome assembly. Among his latest contributions is FASTK, a highly optimized kmer counter for high-fidelity shotgun read datasets.

Myers was voted the most influential in bioinformatics in 2001 by Genome Technology Magazine and was elected to the National Academy of Engineering in 2003. In 2004, together with Martin Vingron, Myers was awarded the Max Planck Research Prize for international cooperation in bioinformatics. He was awarded the ISCB Accomplishment by a Senior Scientist Award for outstanding contribution to bioinformatics, in particular his work on sequence comparison algorithms.

== Awards and honours ==
- 2022: IEEE Frances E. Allen Medal (with Webb Miller)
- 2019: Milner Award by the Royal Society
- 2014: Accomplishment by a Senior Scientist Award by the International Society for Computational Biology
- 2004: International Max Planck Research Prize
- 2003: Elected Member of the National Academy of Engineering.
- 2001: Paris Kanellakis Award by the Association for Computing Machinery
