= Michael Boehnke =

American geneticist

- Spouse: Betsy Foxman

Academic background
- Education: BA, mathematics, 1977, University of Oregon; PhD, biomathematics, 1983, University of California, Los Angeles
- Thesis: Advances in pedigree analysis: ascertainment, goodness of fit, and optimization (1983)
- Doctoral advisor: Kenneth Lange

Academic work
- Institutions: University of Michigan
- Doctoral students: Mingyao Li

Michael Lee Boehnke is an American geneticist. He is the Richard G. Cornell Distinguished University Professor of Biostatistics at the University of Michigan School of Public Health, where he also directs the Center for Statistical Genetics. His research focuses on the genetic dissection of complex traits; in a career spanning 25 years, he has developed methods for analysis of human pedigrees, examined the history of breast cancer in genetically at risk individuals, and contributed important discoveries on the genetics of type 2 diabetes and related traits, such as obesity and blood lipid levels.

== Early life ==
Boehnke completed his Bachelor of Arts degree in mathematics from the University of Oregon before applying for a Fulbright Scholarship in Freiburg, Germany. Upon returning to North America, he volunteered in the lab of ecologists Bill Bradshaw and Chris Holzapfel who convinced him to apply for graduate school instead of law school. On their advice, he received his doctoral degree from the University of California, Los Angeles in biomathematics.

== Career ==
Upon concluding his education, Boehnke joined the faculty at the University of Michigan School of Public Health in 1984. By 1993, he was promoted from associate professor with tenure to professor with tenure.

In 2007, Boehnke collaborated with researchers at deCODE genetics and Mark McCarthy of the University of Oxford to identify seven new genes connected to type 2 diabetes. The groups identified at least four new genetic factors associated with increased risk of diabetes and confirmed the existence of six more. In recognition of the discovery, Science magazine named their discovery as the 2007 breakthrough of the year and Time magazine listed their work among the top 20 medical discoveries of 2007. He was subsequently appointed the Richard G. Cornell Distinguished University Professor of Biostatistics and elected a member of the Institute of Medicine.

After being elected to the American Association for the Advancement of Science, Boehnke co-led an international research team which located 12 more regions on the genome with DNA variants that are associated with increased risk of type 2 diabetes. The following year, he discovered that several of the newly discovered genetic variants may increase the risk of developing bipolar disorder, schizophrenia or both. By 2013, Boehnke was a member of another international research team which uncovered 157 changes in human DNA that alter the levels of cholesterol and other blood fats.

== Personal life ==
Boehnke and his wife Betsy Foxman have three sons together.
