= ISCB Senior Scientist Award =

Annual prize awarded by the International Society for Computational Biology

ISCB Accomplishment by a Senior Scientist Award
- Awarded for: major contributions to the field of computational biology through research, education, service, or a combination of the three
- First award: 2003
- Website: iscb.org/iscb-awards/accomplishment-senior-scientist-award

The ISCB Accomplishment by a Senior Scientist Award is an annual prize awarded by the International Society for Computational Biology for contributions to the field of computational biology.

== Laureates ==
- 2026 - Richard M. Durbin
- 2025 - Amos Bairoch
- 2024 - Tandy Warnow
- 2023 - Mark Gerstein
- 2022 - Ron Shamir
- 2021 - Peer Bork
- 2020 - Steven Salzberg
- 2019 - Bonnie Berger
- 2018 - Ruth Nussinov
- 2017 - Pavel Pevzner
- 2016 - Søren Brunak
- 2015 - Cyrus Chothia
- 2014 - Gene Myers
- 2013 - David Eisenberg
- 2012 - Gunnar von Heijne
- 2011 - Michael Ashburner
- 2010 - Chris Sander
- 2009 - Webb Miller
- 2008 - David Haussler
- 2007 - Temple F. Smith
- 2006 - Michael Waterman
- 2005 - Janet Thornton
- 2004 - David J. Lipman
- 2003 - David Sankoff
