= Søren Brunak =

Danish bioinformatics professor, scientist

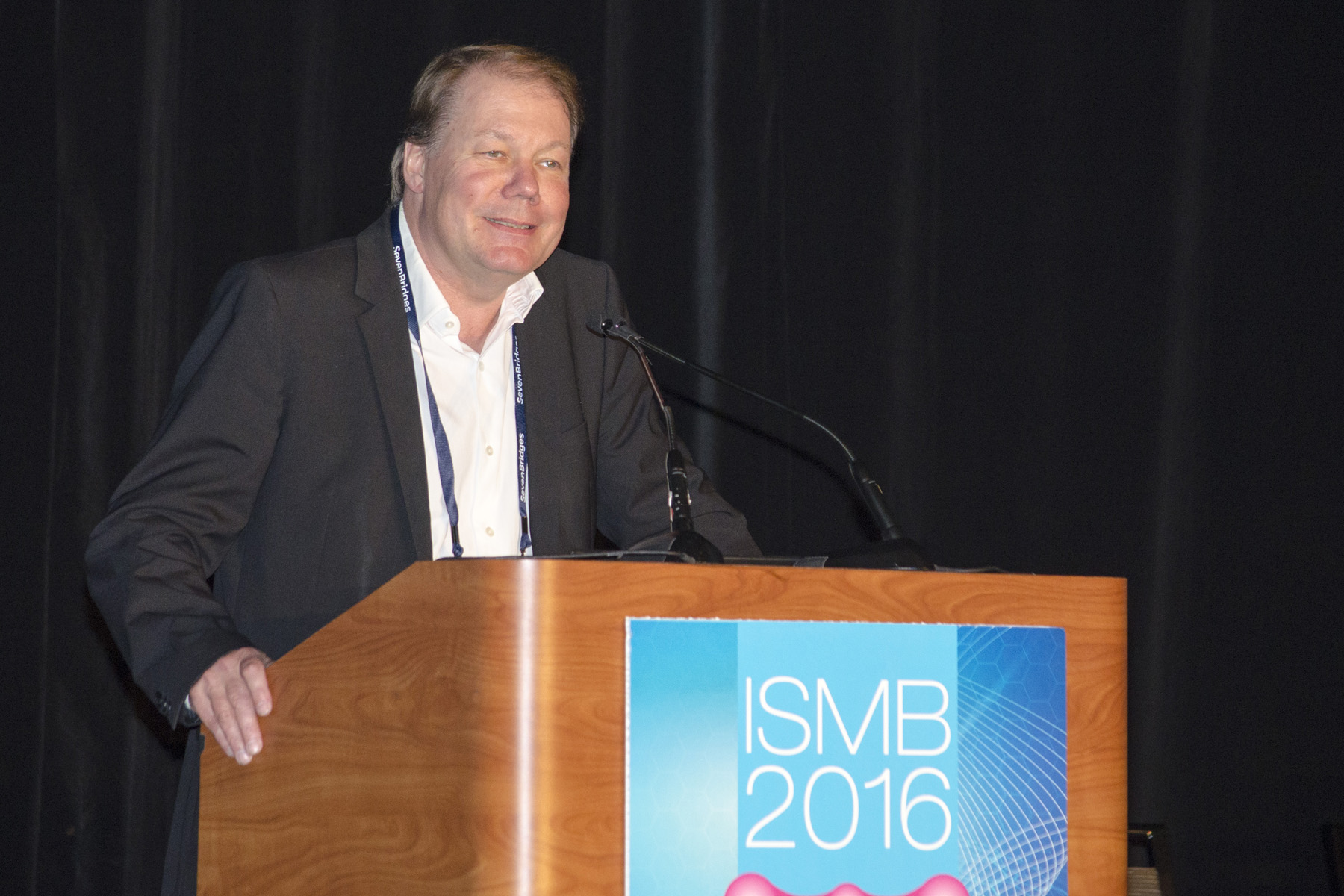
- Søren Brunak speaking at the Intelligent Systems for Molecular Biology conference in 2016
- Born: 1958 (age 67–68)
- Education: University of Copenhagen; Technical University of Denmark
- Known for: Development of computational tools for data integration across molecular and phenotypic levels
- Awards: EMBO Member (2009); ISCB Senior Scientist Award (2016); ISCB Fellow (2011)
- Scientific career
- Fields: Bioinformatics; Systems Biology; Medical Informatics
- Workplaces: University of Copenhagen Technical University of Denmark
- Thesis: Computerens fysik (1987)
- Website: www.cpr.ku.dk/research/disease-systems-biology

Søren Brunak (born 1958) is a Danish biological and physical scientist working in bioinformatics, systems biology, and medical informatics. He is a professor of Disease Systems Biology at the University of Copenhagen and professor of bioinformatics at the Technical University of Denmark. As Research Director at the Novo Nordisk Foundation Center for Protein Research at the University of Copenhagen Medical School, he leads a research effort where molecular-level systems biology data are combined with phenotypic data from the healthcare sector, such as electronic patient records, registry information, and biobank questionnaires. A major aim is to understand the network biology basis for time-ordered comorbidities and discriminate between treatment-related disease correlations and other comorbidities in disease trajectories. Søren Brunak also holds a position as a Medical Informatics Officer at Rigshospitalet, the Capital Region of Denmark.

== Education ==
Søren Brunak obtained his Master of Science degree in Physics, in 1987 from the Niels Bohr Institute at the University of Copenhagen and his Ph.D. in Computational Biology in 1991 at the Department of Structural Properties of Materials, Technical University of Denmark, and in 2002 a Dr.Phil. (Honoris causa) from the Natural Science Faculty of the Stockholm University.

== Career ==
Søren Brunak was in 1993 the founding director of the Center for Biological Sequence Analysis at the Technical University of Denmark. A major, early center in bioinformatics that has existed for more than 20 years. In 2007, Søren Brunak was, with Matthias Mann, a founding research director of the Novo Nordisk Foundation Center for Protein Research at the Faculty for Health and Medical Sciences of the University of Copenhagen, a leading center for the study of human proteins of therapeutic value.

He has been participating in scientific advisory committees of several scientific organizations, such as the European Molecular Biology Laboratory (EMBL, Heidelberg), Ensembl at the European Bioinformatics Institute and Wellcome Trust Sanger Institute (chairman), the Bioinformatics Advisory Committee at the European Bioinformatics Institute (chairman), Institut Pasteur, the Max Planck Institute for Molecular Genetics (Berlin), the Science for Life Laboratory (Stockholm) and the Swiss Institute of Bioinformatics.

== Research ==
Brunak's main research is in bioinformatics, systems biology, and medical informatics. In particular, machine learning-based prediction and the general area of integrative systems biology where heterogeneous data from the molecular level are combined with phenotypic data from the healthcare sector. A general aim is to understand disease mechanisms at the level of protein network biology. An additional focus area is human proteome variation and precision medicine, where patient-specific adverse drug reaction profiles and the discrimination between treatment-related disease correlations and other comorbidities are investigated. The group engages in non-hypothesis-driven research, where massive amounts of data from widely different experimental technologies are combined and analysed with the objective of making discoveries that emerge from the data rather than being the result of specific experiments designed to confirm or disprove given hypotheses. The Brunak group has also over the years been highly within machine learning and has produced numerous, highly used prediction methods, including SignalP, TargetP, NetGene, NetPhos, NetOglyc, NetNES, distanceP, and many others. As of 2017, according to Google Scholar, his most highly cited peer-reviewed publications have been published in the Journal of Molecular Biology, Protein Engineering, and Nature and Nature Methods.

=== Selected book publications ===
- Neural Networks - Computers with Intuition
- Bioinformatics: The Machine Learning Approach
- Immunological Bioinformatics

=== Awards and honors ===
Brunak has been a member of the Danish Academy for the Natural Sciences since 1997, a member of the Board of directors of the International Society for Computational Biology (ISCB) 2001–2004, of the Danish Academy of Technical Sciences since 2002, the Danish Royal Society of Sciences and Letters since 2004, and of the Royal Swedish Academy of Sciences from 2016. He is a fellow of the International Society for Computational Biology (2009), and a Member of the European Molecular Biology Organization in 2009. Brunak received the ISCB Senior Scientist Award from the International Society for Computational Biology in 2016 and elected an ISCB Fellow in 2011. He was awarded the Julius Thomsen's gold medal in 2013 and Dir. Ib Henriksens Prize for Outstanding Science Achievement in 2002. He was awarded the Villum Kann Rasmussen Prize for Research within the Natural and Technical Sciences (2006).
