= Chris Sander (scientist) =

German computational biologist

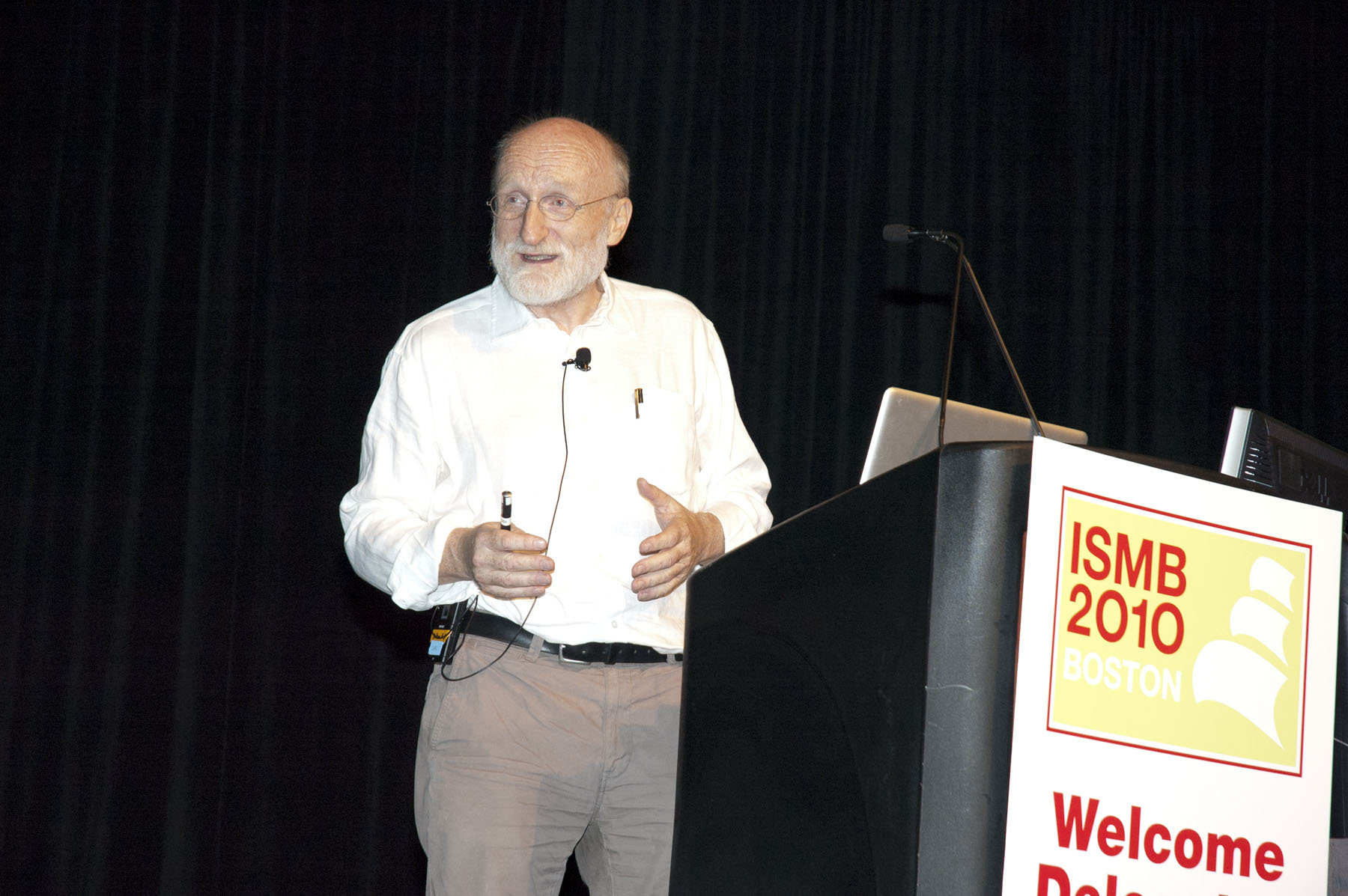
- Chris Sander speaking at ISMB in 2010
- Born: Germany
- Education: University of Berlin; University of California, Berkeley
- Known for: Bioinformatics; Computational biology Cancer genomics
- Relatives: Otto Sander (brother)
- Awards: ISCB Senior Scientist Award (2010); DeLano Award for Computational Biosciences (2018)
- Scientific career
- Workplaces: Dana Farber Cancer Institute; Memorial Sloan–Kettering Cancer Center; Rockefeller University; Cornell University; Weizmann Institute of Science
- Thesis: Analytic properties of bound state wave functions (1975)
- Doctoral students: Burkhard Rost; Reinhard Schneider (biologist); Christos Ouzounis; Peer Bork
- Website: www.sanderlab.org#/people/chrissander

Chris Sander is a German computational biologist based at the Dana-Farber Cancer Center and Harvard Medical School. Previously he was chair of the Computational Biology Programme at the Memorial Sloan–Kettering Cancer Center in New York City. In 2015, he moved his lab to the Dana–Farber Cancer Institute and the Cell Biology Department at Harvard Medical School.

== Education ==
Sander originally trained as a physicist, receiving his undergraduate degree from the University of Berlin in 1967. After a period studying at the University of California, Berkeley and the Niels Bohr Institute in Copenhagen, he gained his PhD degree in theoretical physics from the State University of New York in 1975. His thesis was titled Analytic properties of bound state wave functions.

== Research ==
Sander credits his move from theoretical physics to computational biology to Fred Sanger's 1977 landmark paper in Nature, in which the nucleotide sequence of bacteriophage φX174 was published. Sander has made many contributions to the field of structural bioinformatics including developing tools such as the Families of Structurally Similar Proteins (FSSP) database and the DSSP algorithm for assigning secondary structure to the amino acids of a protein, given the atomic-resolution coordinates of that protein.

Sander was a founder of the biocomputing program at the European Molecular Biology Laboratory in Heidelberg, before moving the program to the European Bioinformatics Institute in Cambridge. He has served as chief information officer for the biopharmaceutical company Millennium Pharmaceuticals and has been an advisor to IBM's Deep Computing Initiative, which produced the Deep Blue chess computer.

=== Awards and honours ===
Sander is a former Executive Editor for the journal Bioinformatics. In 2014, he was appointed one of the first Honorary Editors of Bioinformatics.

Sander was awarded the ISCB Accomplishment by a Senior Scientist Award in 2010. He was awarded the 2018 DeLano Award for Computational Biosciences.

== Personal life ==
Sander is the brother of German actor Otto Sander.
