= Hannele Ruohola-Baker =

Biochemist and stem cell researcher

- Born: December 10, 1959 (age 66); Kullaa, Finland
- Education: University of Helsinki; Yale University
- Spouse: David Baker
- Scientific career
- Fields: stem cell biology
- Workplaces: University of Washington
- Doctoral advisor: Susan Ferro-Novick
- Other academic advisors: Yuh Nung; Lily Jan
- Website: sites.uw.edu/ytz//

Hannele Ruohola-Baker (born December 10, 1959) is a Finnish biochemist. She is a professor of biochemistry and associate director of the Institute for Stem Cell and Regenerative Medicine at the University of Washington in Seattle, Washington. Her research focuses on the molecular biology of stem cells and on the use of Drosophila (fruit flies) as model organisms for human diseases.

== Early life and education ==
Ruohola-Baker was born in the small village of Kullaa, Finland, in 1959. She received her bachelor's and master's degree from the University of Helsinki and received her Ph.D. in cell biology from Yale University in 1989, studying cellular transport and advised by Susan Ferro-Novick. She then moved to a visiting fellowship at the Ludwig Institute for Cancer Research at the Karolinska Institute in Stockholm and subsequently to a postdoctoral fellowship at the University of California, San Francisco with Yuh Nung Jan and Lily Jan.

== Academic career ==
Ruohola-Baker began her faculty career at the University of Washington in 1993 and became a full professor in 2004. She held a Pew Scholars grant from 1996-2000.

== Research ==
Ruohola-Baker's research focuses on stem cells and the molecular requirements for differentiation, with particular interest in the role of microRNA and in the relationship between metabolism and epigenetic changes in different types of stem cells. The research group also has a long-standing interest in studying the Notch and S1P signaling pathway using Drosophila as models of human diseases, particularly Duchenne muscular dystrophy and cancer.

== Personal life ==
Ruohola-Baker is married to fellow UW biochemist David Baker, who won the 2024 Nobel Prize in Chemistry.
