= Martin Steinegger =

Martin Steinegger may refer to:

- Martin Steinegger (ice hockey)
- Martin Steinegger (scientist)
