= David Baker (biochemist) =

American biochemist and computational biologist (born 1962)

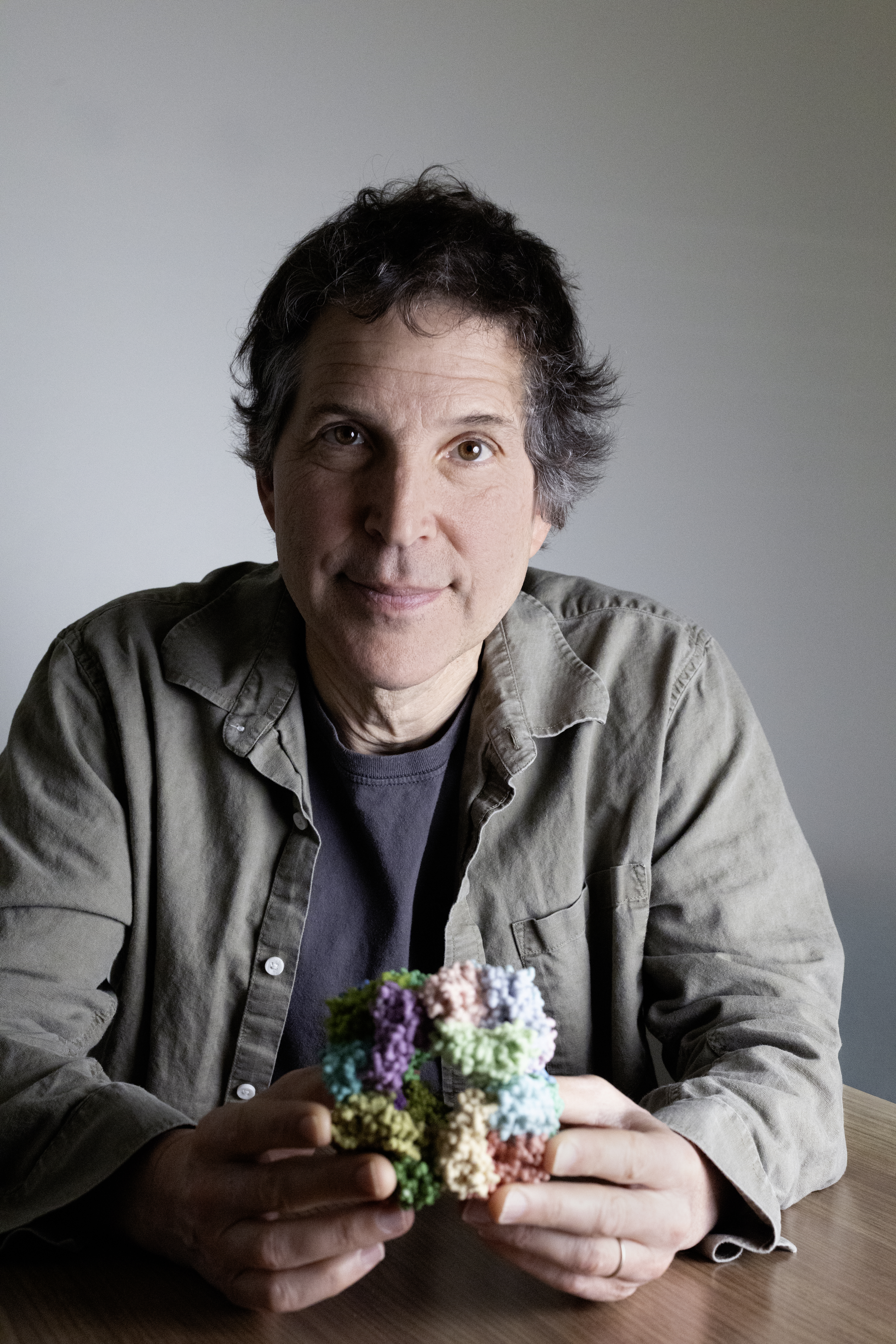
- Baker in 2026
- Born: October 6, 1962 (age 64); Seattle, Washington, U.S.
- Education: Harvard University (BA); University of California, Berkeley (PhD)
- Known for: Protein design; Protein structure prediction; Rosetta@Home; Fold.it
- Spouse: Hannele Ruohola
- Awards: Beckman Young Investigators Award; Overton Prize; Feynman Prize in Nanotechnology; TED's Audacious Prize; Breakthrough Prize in Life Sciences (2021) Wiley Prize (2022) BBVA Foundation Frontiers of Knowledge Award (2022) Nobel Prize in Chemistry (2024)
- Scientific career
- Fields: Computational biology
- Workplaces: University of Washington; Howard Hughes Medical Institute
- Thesis: Reconstitution of Intercompartmental Protein Transport in Yeast Extracts (1989)
- Doctoral advisor: Randy Schekman
- Other academic advisors: David Agard
- Doctoral students: Richard Bonneau
- Other notable students: Post-docs: Brian Kuhlman; Tanja Kortemme; Jens Meiler; Rubul Mout
- Website: www.bakerlab.org

David Baker (born October 6, 1962) is an American biochemist and computational biologist who has pioneered methods to design proteins and predict their three-dimensional structures. He is the Henrietta and Aubrey Davis Endowed Professor in Biochemistry, an investigator with the Howard Hughes Medical Institute, and an adjunct professor of genome sciences, bioengineering, chemical engineering, computer science, and physics at the University of Washington. He was awarded the shared 2024 Nobel Prize in Chemistry for his work on computational protein design.

Baker is a member of the United States National Academy of Sciences and of the United States National Academy of Engineering, and is the director of the University of Washington's Institute for Protein Design. He has co-founded more than a dozen biotechnology companies and was included in Time magazine's inaugural list of the 100 Most Influential People in health in 2024. As of October 2026, Baker's research group at the University of Washington includes over 50 graduate students and 150 active lab members, as well as another 200 previous trainees and alumni.

== Biography ==
=== Early life and education ===
Baker was born into a Jewish family in Seattle, Washington on October 6, 1962, the son of physicist Marshall Baker and geophysicist Marcia (née Bourgin) Baker. He graduated from Seattle's Garfield High School.

Baker received a Bachelor of Arts degree with a major in biology from Harvard University in 1984. He then joined the laboratory of Randy Schekman, where he worked primarily on protein transport and trafficking in yeast, and obtained a Doctor of Philosophy in biochemistry from the University of California, Berkeley in 1989. In 1993, he completed his postdoctoral training in biophysics with David Agard at the University of California, San Francisco.

=== Career ===
Baker joined the Department of Biochemistry at the University of Washington School of Medicine as a faculty member in 1993. He became a Howard Hughes Medical Institute investigator in 2000. Baker was elected a Fellow of the American Academy of Arts and Sciences in 2009.

=== Personal life ===
Baker is married to Hannele Ruohola-Baker, also a biochemist at the University of Washington. They have two children.

== Research ==
Although primarily known for the development of computational methods for predicting and designing the structures and functions of proteins, Baker maintains an active experimental biochemistry group. He has authored over 600 scientific papers.

Baker's group developed the Rosetta algorithm for ab initio protein structure prediction, which has been extended into a tool for protein design, a distributed computing project called Rosetta@home, and the computer game Foldit. Baker served as the director of the Rosetta Commons, a consortium of labs and researchers that develop biomolecular structure prediction and design software. His group has regularly competed in the CASP structure prediction competition, specializing in ab initio methods, including both manually assisted and automated variants of the Rosetta protocol. Using artificial intelligence, his group later developed a newer version of the program known as RoseTTAFold.

Baker's group is also active in the field of protein design; they are noted for designing Top7, the first artificial protein with a novel fold.

In 2017, Baker's Institute for Protein Design received over $11 million from Open Philanthropy, followed by an additional $3 million donation in 2021.

In April 2019, Baker gave a TED talk titled "5 challenges we could solve by designing new proteins" at TED2019 in Vancouver, Canada.

Baker has co-founded several biotechnology companies, including Prospect Genomics which was acquired by an Eli Lilly subsidiary in 2001, Icosavax which was acquired by AstraZeneca in 2023, Sana Biotechnology, Lyell Immunotherapeutics, Xaira Therapeutics and GenBio AI.

== Awards ==
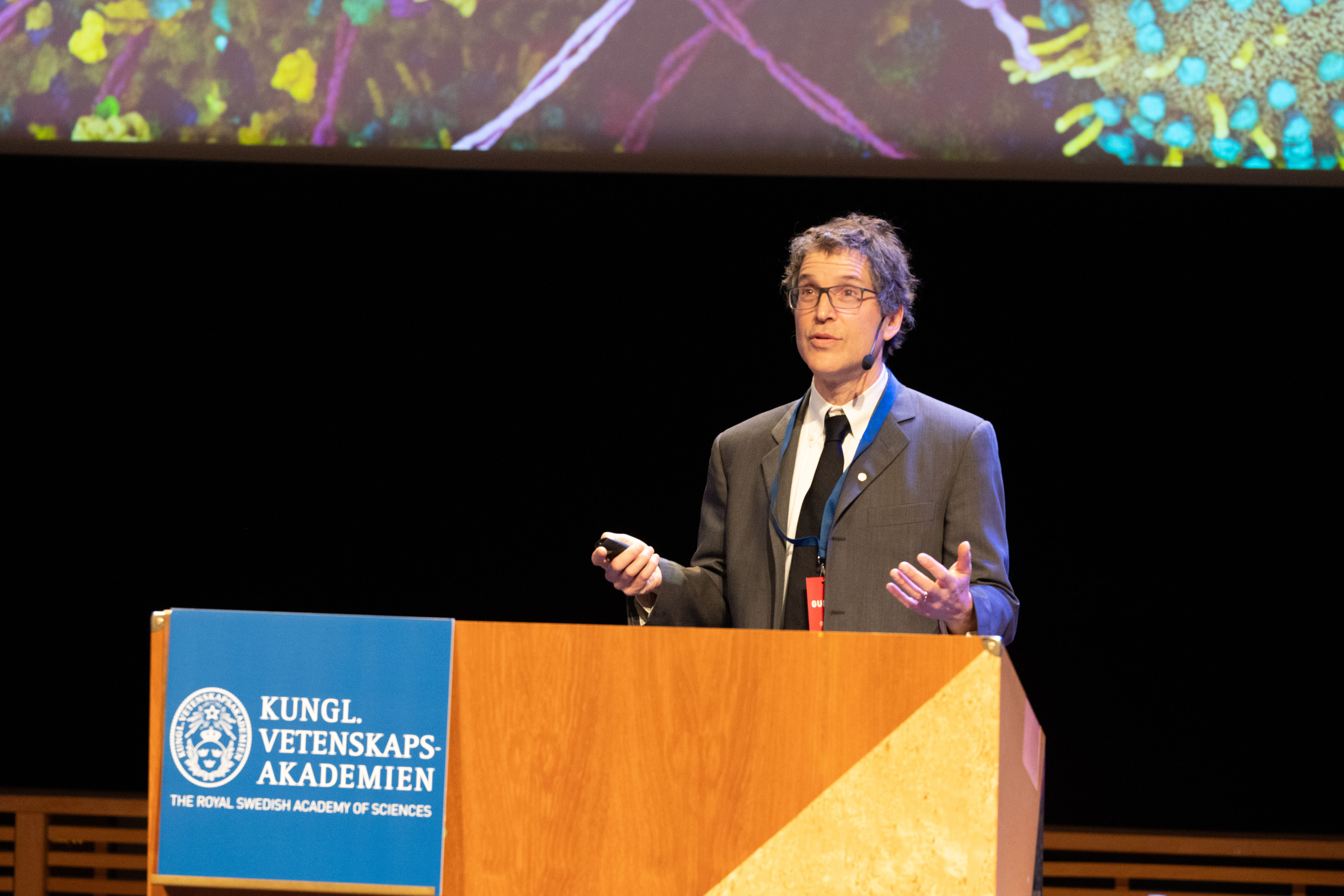
Baker delivering a lecture during 2024 Nobel Week

For his work on protein folding, Baker has received numerous awards, including the Overton Prize (2002), the Sackler International Prize in Biophysics (2008), the Wiley Prize (2022) and the BBVA Foundation Frontiers of Knowledge Award in the category "Biology and Biomedicine" (2022).

For his work on protein design, Baker has received the Newcomb Cleveland Prize (2004), the Feynman Prize in Nanotechnology (2004), and the Breakthrough Prize in Life Sciences (2021).

In 2024, Baker was awarded half of the Nobel Prize in Chemistry for his work on protein design; the other half went to John M. Jumper and Demis Hassabis for development of AlphaFold, a program for protein structure prediction.

In 2025, Baker was elected to the National Academy of Inventors (NAI) 2025 class of NAI fellows.

== See also ==
- List of Jewish Nobel laureates
