= Sofia Hjulgrén =

Finnish politician

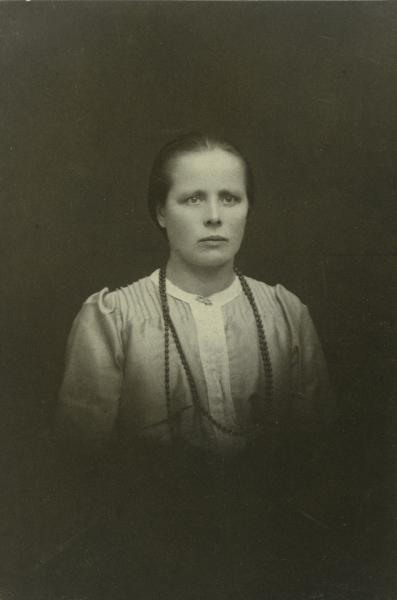

Edla Sofia Hjulgrén (née Lundström; 28 June 1875 in Kullaa – 21 May 1918 in Viipuri) was a Finnish politician. She was married to a sawmill worker. She was a member of the Parliament of Finland from 1913 to 1916, representing the Social Democratic Party of Finland (SDP). During the Finnish Civil War, she sided with the Reds and was made prisoner by White troops on 29 April 1918. She was sentenced to death and shot in Viipuri on 21 May 1918.
