= G. Christian Overton =

- Born: George Christian Overton; February 15, 1948
- Died: June 1, 2000 (aged 52); Swarthmore, Pennsylvania
- Education: University of New Mexico; Johns Hopkins University
- Children: 4
- Scientific career
- Fields: Bioinformatics
- Workplaces: University of Pennsylvania
- Thesis: An analysis of the structure and heterogeneity of histone genes in the sea urchin, Strongylocentrotus purpuratus (1979)

George Christian Overton (February 15, 1948 – June 1, 2000) was a bioinformatician and Director of the Center for Bioinformatics at the University of Pennsylvania. He is recognised as a pioneer in genomics research.

== Education and career ==
Overton received his Bachelor of Science degree in Mathematics and Physics from the University of New Mexico in 1971, and his PhD in biophysics in 1979 from Johns Hopkins University. His thesis was on histone genes in the purple sea urchin Strongylocentrotus purpuratus.

In the 1980s, Overton was part of the artificial intelligence research group at the Unisys Center for Advanced Information Technology in Pennsylvania.

He joined the University of Pennsylvania in 1991 as a research associate professor of genetics in the School of Medicine. In 1997, he became associate professor and director of the Center for Bioinformatics. His research interests included genome annotation, gene prediction and recognition of regulatory elements.

From 1997 to 2000, Overton was a member of the International Society for Computational Biology (ISCB) Board of Directors.

== Death and legacy ==
Overton died in 2000 from complications arising from cardiomyopathy. Subsequently, the ISCB set up the Overton Prize in his honor; the prize is awarded annually to a scientist in the early to mid-career stage who has already made a significant contribution to the field of computational biology. The first recipient was Christopher Burge.
