= Kullaa =

Former municipality of Finland, now part of Ulvila

Coordinates: 61°28′N 022°10′E

Coat of arms of Kullaa

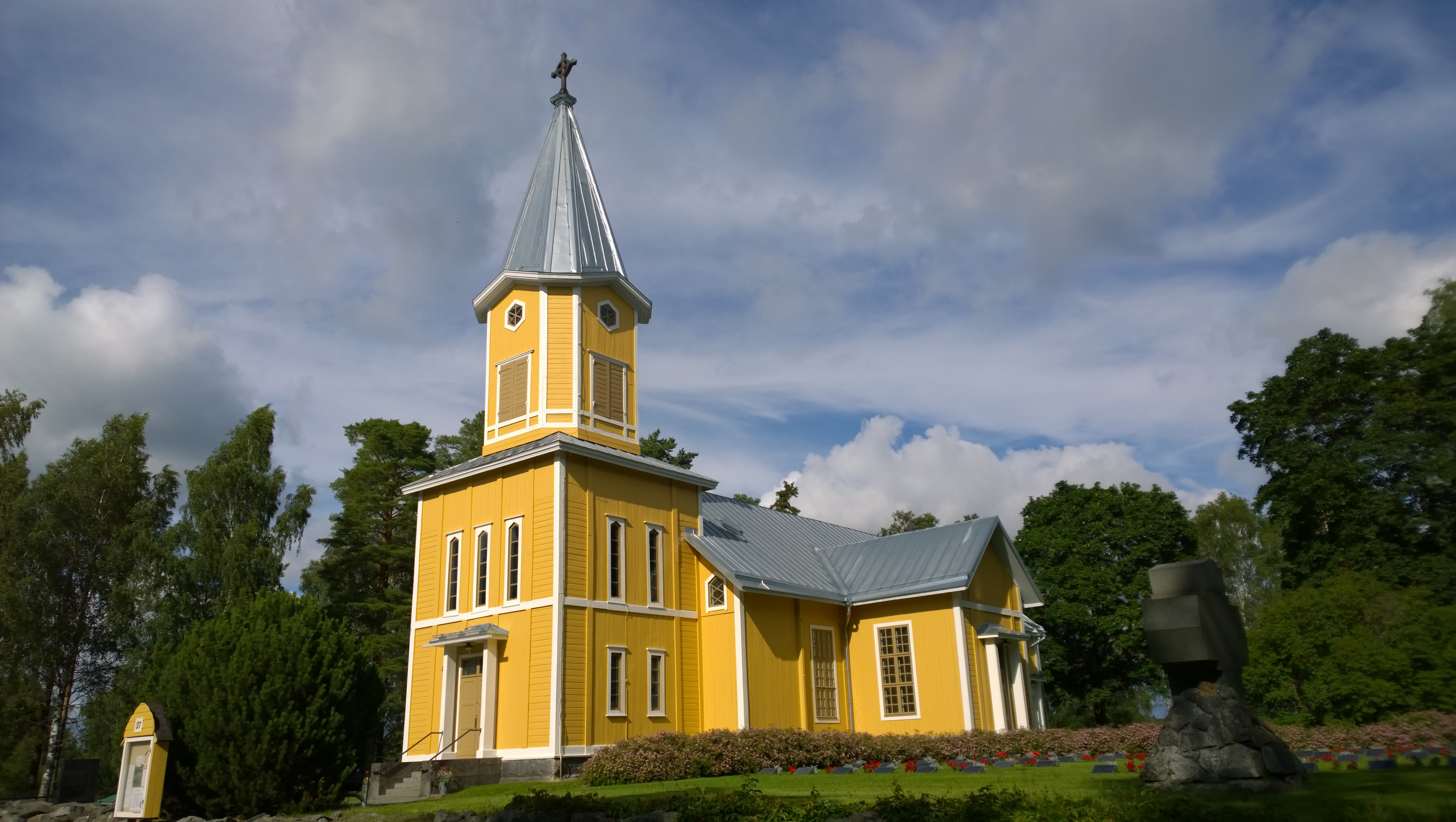
Kullaa Church

Kullaa is a former municipality of Finland. It joined Ulvila on 1 January 2005. It is located in the province of Western Finland and is part of the Satakunta region.

The municipality had a population of 1,601 (2003) and covered an area of 283.19 km² of which 19.46 km² is water. The population density was 5.7 inhabitants per km². The municipality was unilingually Finnish.

== People born in Kullaa ==
- Sofia Hjulgrén (1875–1918)
- Kaarlo Kangasniemi (1941–)
- Kauko Kangasniemi (1942–2013)
- Hannele Ruohola-Baker (1959–)
