= Overton Prize =

ISCB Overton Prize
- Awarded for: “outstanding accomplishment to a scientist in the early to mid stage of his or her career”
- Sponsored by: International Society for Computational Biology (ISCB)
- First award: 2001
- Website: www.iscb.org/about-iscb/awards-and-competitions

The ISCB Overton Prize is a computational biology prize awarded annually for outstanding accomplishment by a scientist in the early to mid stage of their career. Laureates have made significant contribution to the field of computational biology either through research, education, service, or a combination of the three.

The prize was established by the International Society for Computational Biology (ISCB) in memory of G. Christian Overton a major contributor to the field of bioinformatics and member of the ISCB Board of Directors who died unexpectedly in 2000.

The Overton Prize is traditionally awarded at the Intelligent Systems for Molecular Biology (ISMB) conference.

== Laureates ==
Laureates of the Overton Prize include:

- 2025 - James Zou
- 2024 - Martin Steinegger
- 2023 - Jingyi Jessica Li
- 2022 - Po-Ru Loh
- 2021 - Barbara Engelhardt
- 2020 - Jian Peng
- 2019 - Christophe Dessimoz
- 2018 - Cole Trapnell
- 2017 - Christoph Bock
- 2016 - Debora Marks
- 2015 - Curtis Huttenhower
- 2014 - Dana Pe'er
- 2013 - Gonçalo Abecasis
- 2012 - Ziv Bar-Joseph
- 2011 - Olga Troyanskaya
- 2010 - Steven E. Brenner
- 2009 - Trey Ideker
- 2008 - Aviv Regev
- 2007 - Eran Segal
- 2006 - Mathieu Blanchette
- 2005 - Ewan Birney
- 2004 - Uri Alon
- 2003 - Jim Kent
- 2002 - David Baker
- 2001 - Christopher Burge
