= Debora Marks =

Computational biologist

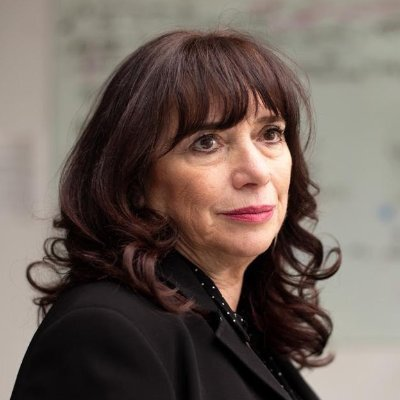
- Debora Marks
- Education: University of Bristol, University of Manchester, Humboldt University
- Awards: Overton Prize, Ben Barres Early Career Award
- Scientific career
- Fields: Artificial Intelligence, Structural Biology, Bioinformatics
- Workplaces: Harvard Medical School
- Thesis: (2010)
- Doctoral advisor: Reinhart Heinrich, Hanspeter Herzl
- Website: https://marks.hms.harvard.edu/

Debora S. Marks is a researcher in computational biology and a Professor of Systems Biology at Harvard Medical School. Her research uses computational approaches to address a variety of biological problems.

== Career and research ==
After an undergraduate degree in medicine she worked in the pharmaceutical industry, coming back to research late in life through a mathematics degree from the University of Manchester. She became interested in microRNAs in the early 2000s and her work on the biology of microRNAs eventually became a PhD thesis, which she submitted under the guidance of Reinhart Heinrich to Humboldt University of Berlin in 2010. One key contribution was her discovery that transfection of microRNAs into cells counter-intuitively increases the expression of some genes, due to competition for the cellular machinery that processes small RNAs. In collaboration with Alexander van Oudenaarden and Nils Bluthgen, she showed that microRNAs reduce the noise in protein expression when mRNA levels are low, reducing the likelihood of unwanted protein expression as a result of leakage at a gene's promoter.

She is best known for her work on protein structure prediction: her method, which draws on an approach from statistical physics, maximum entropy under constraint, uses correlations between the sequences of protein family members from multiple species to build models of protein structure from sequence alone. In some cases the predicted models are sufficiently accurate to permit molecular replacement of the model into X-ray crystallography data, facilitating phase replacement. The algorithm has been extensively used by other researchers to predict and gain insights into protein structures, for example the structures of the σ2 receptor and the tetraspanin CD81. Marks and her close collaborator and husband Chris Sander have shown that this approach can also be used to predict the structures of non-coding RNAs and RNA-protein complexes, to identify otherwise undetectable structured states in disordered proteins and to predict the functional effects of sequence mutations.

== Awards ==
In 2016, Marks was awarded the Overton Prize by the International Society for Computational Biology.

In 2018, Marks was awarded the Ben Barres Early Career Award by the Chan Zuckerberg Initiative as part of the Neurodegeneration Challenge Network.

In 2022, Marks was elected as a Fellow of the International Society for Computational Biology.

In 2025, Marks received the inaugural Margot and Tom Pritzker Prize for AI in Science Research Excellence

In 2026, it was announced at the Cold Spring Harbor Laboratory 90th Symposium on AI that Marks was elected fellow of the Royal Society of London.
