= Peter Novick (scientist) =

American scientist

Peter Novick is an American scientist who holds the George Palade Endowed Chair in the Department of Cellular and Molecular Medicine at the University of California, San Diego. His research interests focus on the biology of cell membranes, particularly the secretory pathway and other aspects of membrane trafficking and intracellular transport.

== Early life and education ==
Novick was born in 1954 and raised in New York. He received his bachelor's degree in biology from the Massachusetts Institute of Technology. Novick attended graduate school at the University of California, Berkeley, where he was among the first graduate students in the laboratory of future Nobel Prize winner Randy Schekman, and from which he received his PhD in 1981. Novick's work focused on the molecular genetics of the secretory pathway in yeast.

== Academic career and honors ==
In 1985, Novick began his independent faculty career at Yale University. He moved to UCSD in 2008 as the first holder of the George Palade Endowed Chair.

Novick was elected to the American Academy of Arts and Sciences in 2006 and to the National Academy of Sciences in 2013.

== Personal life ==
Novick is married to fellow scientist and UCSD professor Susan Ferro-Novick.
