= Christoph Bock =

German bioinformatician and principal investigator

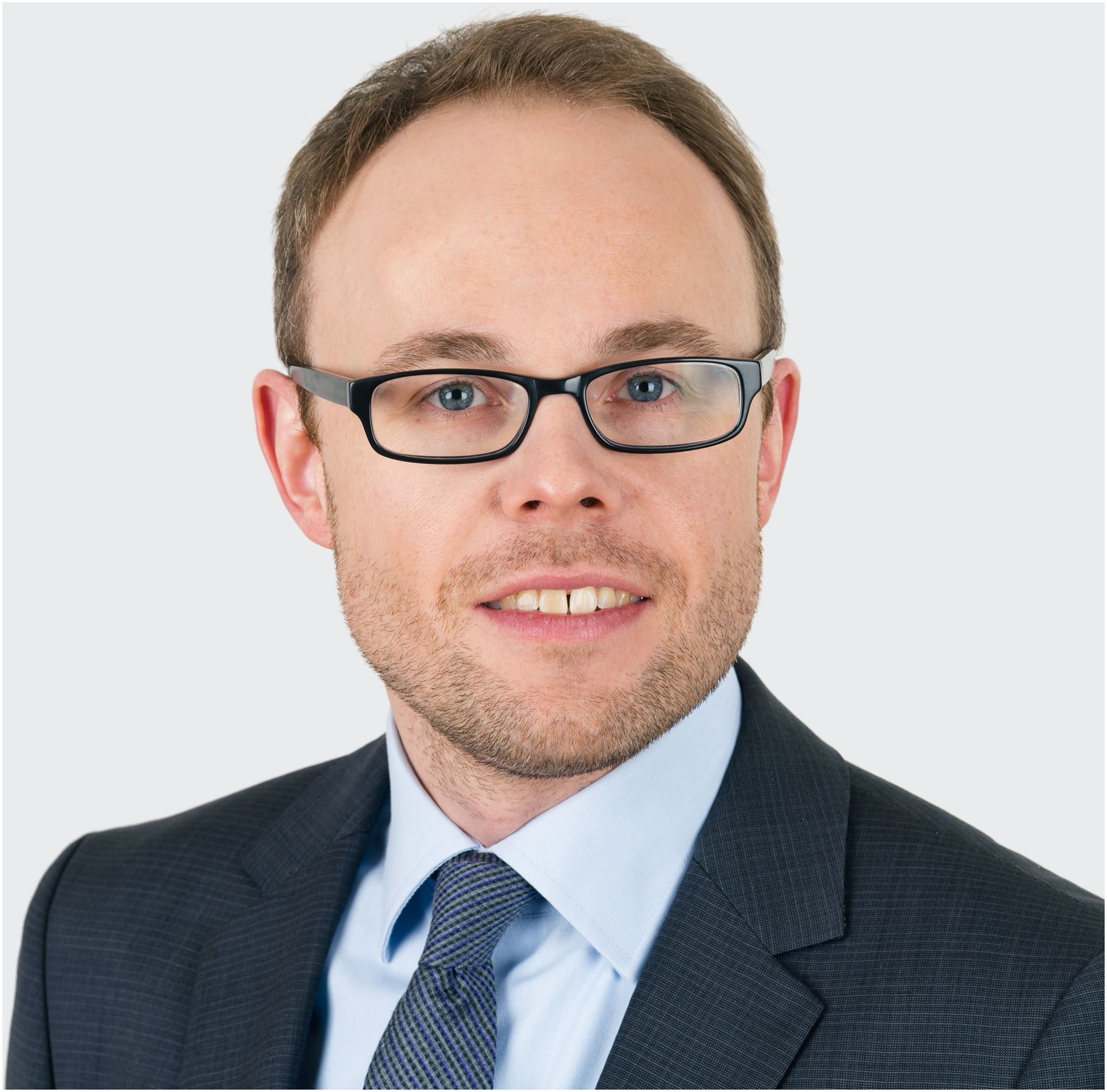
- Education: University of Mannheim; Saarland University (PhD)
- Awards: Otto Hahn Medal (2009); Overton Prize (2017)
- Scientific career
- Fields: Bioinformatics
- Workplaces: Max Planck Institute for Informatics; Austrian Academy of Sciences; Medical University of Vienna; Broad Institute
- Thesis: Computational Epigenetics (2008)
- Doctoral advisor: Thomas Lengauer
- Website: cemm.at/research/groups/core-groups/christoph-bock/group

Christoph Bock is a German bioinformatician and principal investigator at the Research Center for Molecular Medicine (CeMM) of the Austrian Academy of Sciences and a visiting professor at the Medical University of Vienna.

== Education ==
Bock carried out his undergraduate studies at the University of Mannheim, focusing on computer science and business information, with an emphasis on machine learning.

Bock gained his PhD in 2008 from Saarland University for research carried out at the Max Planck Institute for Informatics on computational epigenetics supervised by Thomas Lengauer.

== Research and career ==
Following his PhD, he undertook postdoctoral research with Alexander Meissner at the Broad Institute, where he contributed to the NIH Roadmap Epigenomics Project.

Bock joined CeMM as a principal investigator in 2012. His research focuses on the application of machine learning and biostatistics to computational epigenetics. He is also interested in the application of bioinformatics to epigenetic diagnosis and personalised medicine. Bock's lab has explored integrating technologies to efficiently assess the impact of many genes in gene regulation. His lab has combined CRISPR genome editing with single-cell RNA-seq to create the CROP-seq method, which enables high-throughput analysis of gene regulation.

Beyond his work at CeMM, he has also been a principal investigator of BLUEPRINT, a member organisation of the International Human Epigenome Consortium.

=== Awards and honors ===
Bock was awarded the Otto Hahn Medal by the Max Planck Society in 2009: this award recognises outstanding PhD theses.

In 2017, Bock was awarded the Overton Prize by the International Society for Computational Biology, for his significant contributions to computational biology research.

As of 2017, Bock serves on the editorial board of the Genome Biology journal.
