= Olga Troyanskaya =

American academic

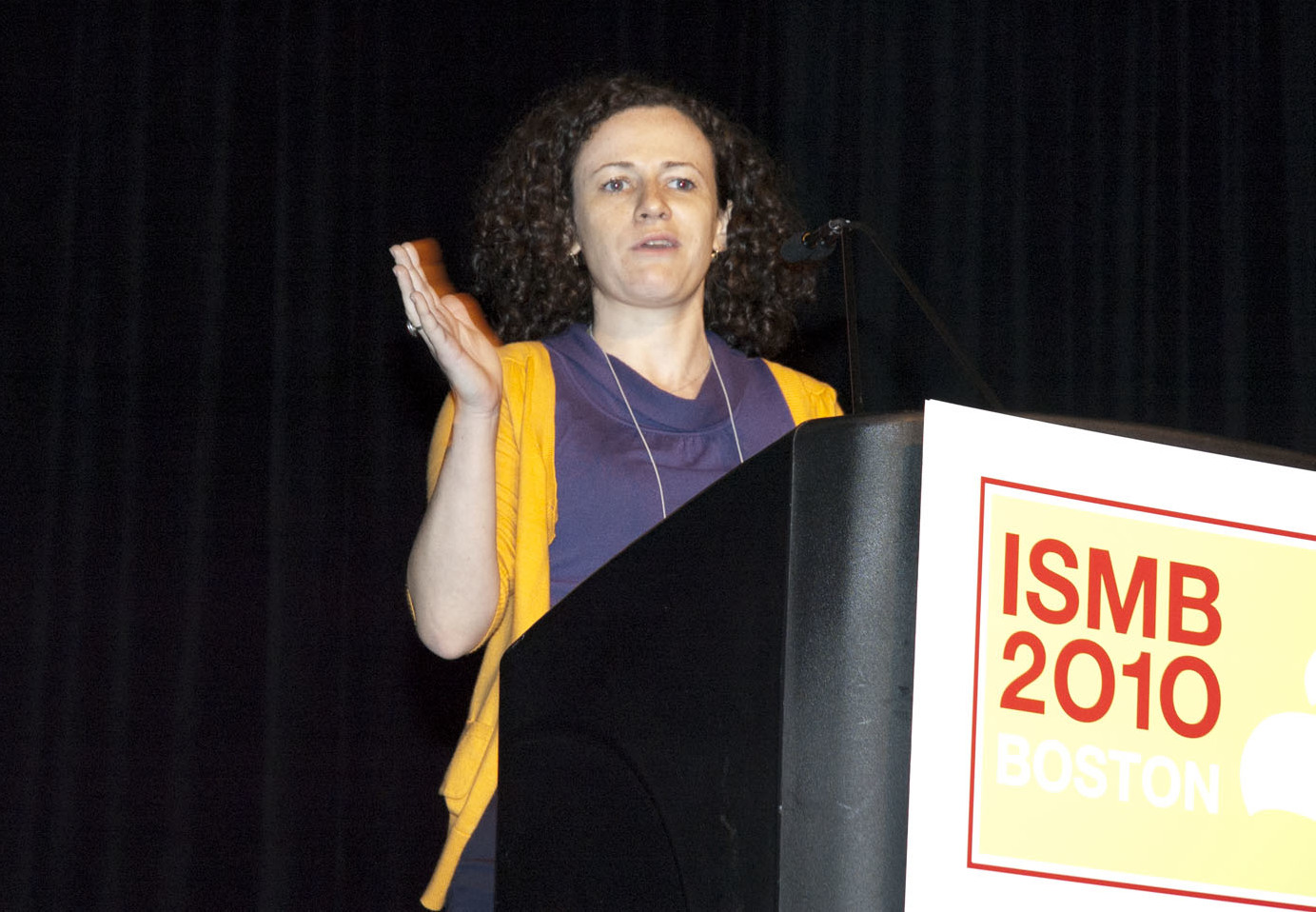
- Olga Troyanskaya speaking at ISMB 2010
- Born: Olga G. Troyanskaya
- Education: University of Richmond (BSc); Stanford University (PhD)
- Awards: Overton Prize (2011)
- Scientific career
- Fields: Bioinformatics; Genomics; Machine learning; Computational biology
- Workplaces: Princeton University; Stanford University; University of Richmond
- Thesis: Improving the specificity of biological signal detection from microarray data
- Doctoral advisor: Russ Altman; David Botstein
- Doctoral students: Curtis Huttenhower
- Website: function.princeton.edu

Olga G. Troyanskaya is an American scientist. She is Professor in the Department of Computer Science and the Lewis-Sigler Institute for Integrative Genomics at Princeton University and the Deputy Director for Genomics at the Flatiron Institute's Center for Computational Biology in New York City. She studies protein function and interactions in biological pathways by analyzing genomic data using computational tools.

== Education ==
Troyanskaya completed her Bachelor of Science degree in Computer Science and Biology at the University of Richmond in 1999 and her Ph.D. Biomedical Informatics at Stanford University in 2003.

== Awards ==
In 2011, she was awarded the Overton Prize from the International Society for Computational Biology (ISCB). In 2014, she was awarded the Ira Herskowitz Award from the Genetics Society of America. In 2017, she was elected as a Fellow of the ISCB. In 2020, she was elected Fellow of the Association for Computing Machinery (ACM) " for contributions to computational biology and data integration."
