= Barbara Engelhardt =

American computer scientist

- Born: Barbara Elizabeth Engelhardt
- Education: Stanford University (BS, MS) University of California, Berkeley (PhD)
- Awards: Overton Prize (2021)
- Scientific career
- Fields: Statistical genetics Bayesian statistics Machine learning Statistical inference Genomics
- Workplaces: Princeton University; Chicago University; Jet Propulsion Laboratory
- Thesis: Predicting protein molecular function (2007)
- Doctoral advisor: Michael I. Jordan
- Website: www.cs.princeton.edu/~bee/

Barbara Elizabeth Engelhardt is an American computer scientist and specialist in bioinformatics. Working as a Professor at Stanford University, her work has focused on latent variable models, exploratory data analysis for genomic data, and QTLs. In 2021, she was awarded the Overton Prize by the International Society for Computational Biology.

== Education ==
Engelhardt received a Bachelor of Science in symbolic systems and a Master of Science in computer science from Stanford University. She received a PhD in 2008 from the University of California, Berkeley supervised by Michael I. Jordan.

== Career and research ==
Engelhardt worked as a postdoctoral researcher at the University of Chicago in the Department of Human Genetics with Matthew Stephens from 2008 to 2011. She joined Duke University in 2011 as an assistant professor in the Biostatistics and Bioinformatics Department. She joined Princeton University as an assistant professor in 2014 and received a promotion to Associate Professor with tenure in 2017. In August 2022, she moved to California, she now holds the position of Professor at Stanford University and Gladstone Institute of Data Science and Biotechnology.

After graduating from Stanford, Engelhardt worked at the Jet Propulsion Laboratory in the Artificial Intelligence group for two years, working on planning and scheduling for autonomous spacecraft. As a graduate student at Berkeley, she developed statistical models for protein function annotation and statistical frameworks for reasoning about ontologies. During her postdoctoral research, she developed sparse factor analysis models for population structure and Bayesian models for association testing.

In her faculty position, the bulk of Engelhardt's research focused on developing latent variable models and exploratory data analysis for genomic data, and also on statistical models for association testing in expression QTLs. As a member of the Genotype Tissue Expression (GTEx) Consortium, her group was responsible for the trans-eQTL discovery and analysis in the GTEx v6 and v8 data.

Post tenure, Engelhardt's research in these latent variable models has expanded to include single cell sequencing, with a particular focus on spatial transcriptomics. She also has work on Bayesian experimental design using contextual multi-armed bandits, and has adapted this work to the novel species problem in order to inform single cell data collection for atlas building. Her work has also expanded into machine learning for electronic healthcare records.

Engelhardt's work has been featured in Quanta Magazine. In 2017, she gave a TEDx talk entitled: 'Not What but Why: Machine Learning for Understanding Genomics.'

=== Honors and awards ===
Engelhardt's research has been funded by the National Institutes of Health through two R01 grants and a number of other mechanisms. Engelhardt has been recognized by several awards including an Alfred P. Sloan Fellowship in Computational Biology, a National Science Foundation CAREER Award, two Chan Zuckerberg Initiative grants for the Human Cell Atlas, and a Fast Grant for her recent work on COVID-19. In 2021, she was awarded the Overton Prize by the International Society for Computational Biology.

Engelhardt's postdoctoral work was partly funded through an NIH NHGRI K99 grant, and her PhD was partly funded through an NSF Graduate Research Fellowship and the Google Anita Borg Scholarship in 2005. She received SMBE's Walter M. Fitch Prize in 2004.

=== Service and leadership ===
Engelhardt served on the Board of Directors (2014–2017) and the Senior Advisory Council (2017–present) for Women in Machine Learning. She is the Diversity & Inclusion Co-chair at the International Conference on Machine Learning (ICML, 2018–2022). In 2019, she was a member of the NIH Advisory Committee to the Director, Working Group on Artificial Intelligence
