= Ron Milo =

Israeli biologist and academic

- רון מילוא
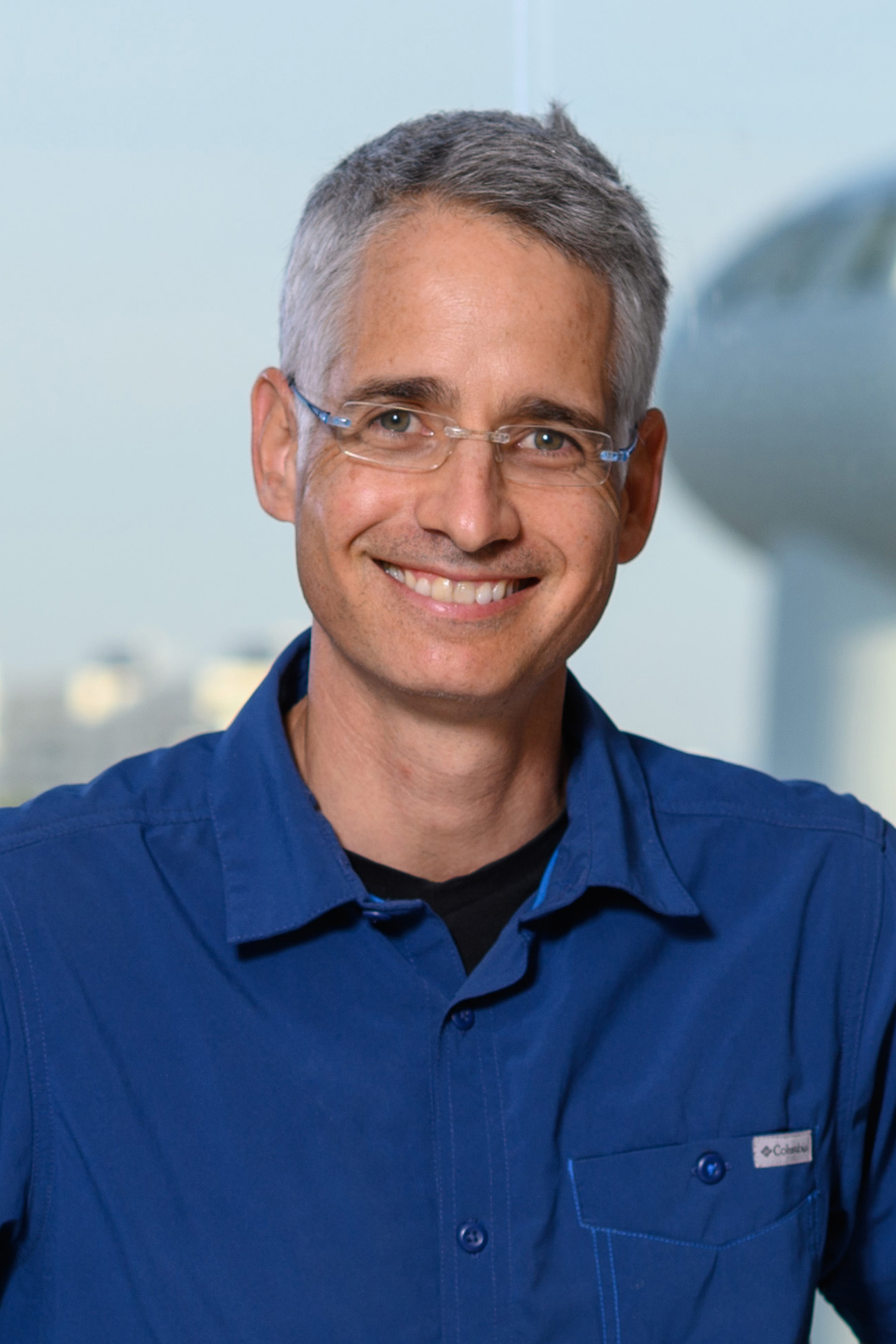
- Born: February 11, 1975 (age 51)
- Education: Hebrew University of Jerusalem; Weizmann Institute of Science
- Scientific career
- Workplaces: Weizmann Institute of Science
- Doctoral advisor: Uri Alon
- Website: www.weizmann.ac.il/plants/Milo

Ron Milo (Hebrew: רון מילוא; born February 11, 1975) is a Professor of Systems Biology at the Weizmann Institute of Science. He is Weizmann Dean of Education, the chairperson of the Israel society of ecology and environmental sciences and the director of the Institute for environmental sustainability at Weizmann. Formerly he was the chairperson of the Israel young academy.

== Education ==
Ron Milo was born in Haifa and educated in Kfar-Saba. At the age of 15 he won the National Physics Olympiad. He holds a bachelor's degree with honors in physics and mathematics from the Hebrew University as part of the Talpiot program, a master's degree in electrical engineering from Tel Aviv University and a PhD in the laboratory of Professor Uri Alon at the Weizmann Institute of Science. In 2006–2008, Milo was the first Harvard Systems Biology Fellow. at Harvard Medical School.

== Research ==
Milo harnesses the tools of quantitative thinking and systems biology to find solutions to the challenges of sustainability. Milo’s goal is improving the ability of humanity to produce food more efficiently by creating new ways to fixate carbon dioxide from the air. His group demonstrated for the first time an ability to convert carbon dioxide into sugar in a synthetically engineered E. coli.

Milo also leads a global accounting of biomass on earth giving a fresh perspective on the impact of humanity and the future of biodiversity. His work on the biomass distribution on Earth is widely cited for example in BBC documentaries and served for an exhibition in the museum of Natural history in London. He also quantified the land, irrigation water use, and greenhouse gas emissions of dietary choices, and the needed changes required to minimize our impact on the planet.

His book “Cell Biology by the Numbers”, is freely available online and was translated to multiple languages. He is the founder of BioNumbers, the database of useful biological numbers. His papers were cited over 50,000 times.

== Awards ==
- Rothschild Prize (2024)
- European Molecular Biology Organization membership (2019)
- Weizmann Institute Scientific Council Award (2013)
- GE & Science Prize for Young Life Scientists "All Other Countries" category winner (2006)
