= Wendy Garrett =

Wendy Sarah Garrett
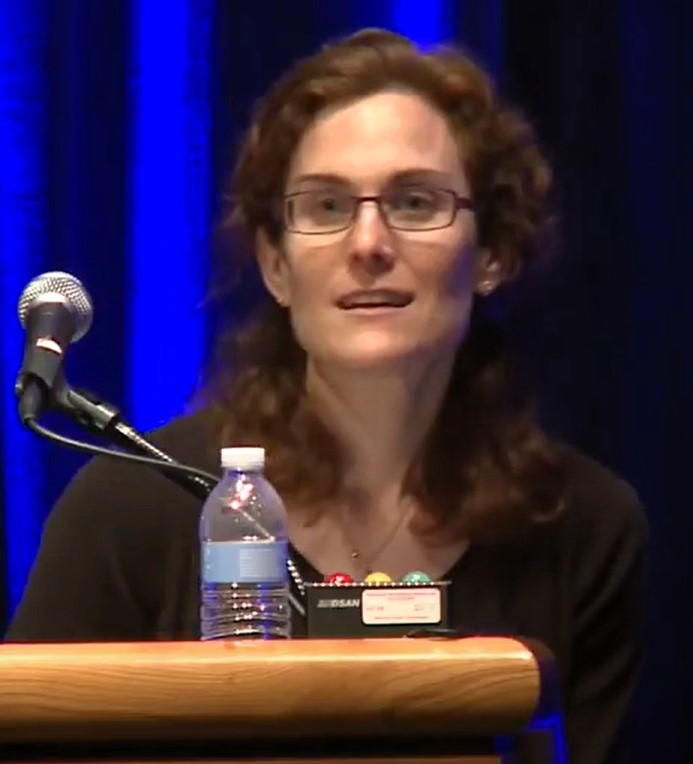
- Garrett speaks at the National Human Genome Research Institute in 2013
- Education: Yale University
- Scientific career
- Workplaces: Harvard Medical School; Dana-Farber Cancer Institute; Harvard T.H. Chan School of Public Health
- Thesis: The regulation of endocytosis in developing dendritic cells (2001)

Wendy Sarah Garrett is an American immunologist, microbiologist, and oncologist who is the Irene Heinz Given Professor of Immunology and Infectious Diseases at the Harvard Chan School of Public Health. She is also a Professor of Medicine at Harvard Medical School and Dana-Farber Cancer Institute.

== Early life and education ==
Garrett was a M.D./Ph.D. student at Yale University. For her doctoral research, she studied the regulation of endocytosis in the development of dendritic cells where she was mentored by Ira Mellman, Jorge Galan, and the late Ralph Steinman. She was a Research Fellow the Dana-Farber Cancer Institute and postdoctoral researcher at the Harvard.

== Research and career ==
Garrett investigates host-microbiota interactions in health and disease. She is interested in the interplay between the gastrointestinal immune system and the gut microbiome, particularly in the context of inflammatory bowel disease and colorectal cancer. She has shown that the gut microbiota influence both innate and adaptive immune populations, contributing to immune homeostasis and disease. She identified specific microbial species, pathways, and metabolites that impact health and disease states.

Garrett has investigated the microbes and immune cells that play a role in carcinogenesis and intestinal homeostasis. She has developed approaches that combine meta-omics, microbiology, cellular immunology, biochemistry, cell biology, and cancer biology. To uncover fundamental biological mechanisms and apply findings to precision medicine, Garrett combines mouse models, human specimens, and mammalian and bacterial cells, as well as in vivo and in vitro model systems.

Garrett has shown that Fusobacterium nucleatum, a microbe of the mouth, is abundant in colon tumors. She believes that this could be an early indicator of carcinogenesis.

In 2017, Garrett established a microbiome biobank at Harvard. The biobank is the most comprehensive collection of specimens in the world, using samples of people from the Nurses' Health Study and other long-term cohort studies. In 2020 she was elected to the American Society for Clinical Investigation, who awarded her the Marian W. Ropes, MD Award in 2023. In 2025, she was elected to the American Academy of Arts and Sciences and the National Academy of Medicine.

== Selected publications ==
- Patrick M. Smith; Michael R. Howitt; Nicolai Panikov; Monia Michaud; Carey Ann Gallini; Mohammad Bohlooly-Y; Jonathan N. Glickman; Wendy S. Garrett (2 August 2013). "The microbial metabolites, short-chain fatty acids, regulate colonic Treg cell homeostasis". Science. 341 (6145): 569–73. Bibcode:2013Sci...341..569S. doi:10.1126/science.1241165. ISSN 0036-8075. PMC 3807819. PMID 23828891. Wikidata Q29616351.
- Michelle G Rooks; Wendy S Garrett (1 May 2016). "Gut microbiota, metabolites and host immunity". Nature Reviews Immunology. 16 (6): 341–352. doi:10.1038/nri.2016.42. ISSN 1474-1733. PMC 5541232. PMID 27231050. Wikidata Q36031926.
- Nicola Segata; Jacques Izard; Levi Waldron; Dirk Gevers; Larisa Miropolsky; Wendy S Garrett; Curtis Huttenhower (24 June 2011). "Metagenomic biomarker discovery and explanation". Genome Biology. 12 (6): R60. doi:10.1186/gb-2011-12-6-r60. ISSN 1465-6906. PMC 3218848. PMID 21702898. Wikidata Q35557728.
