= Uri Alon =

Israeli biologist and academic

- אורי אלון
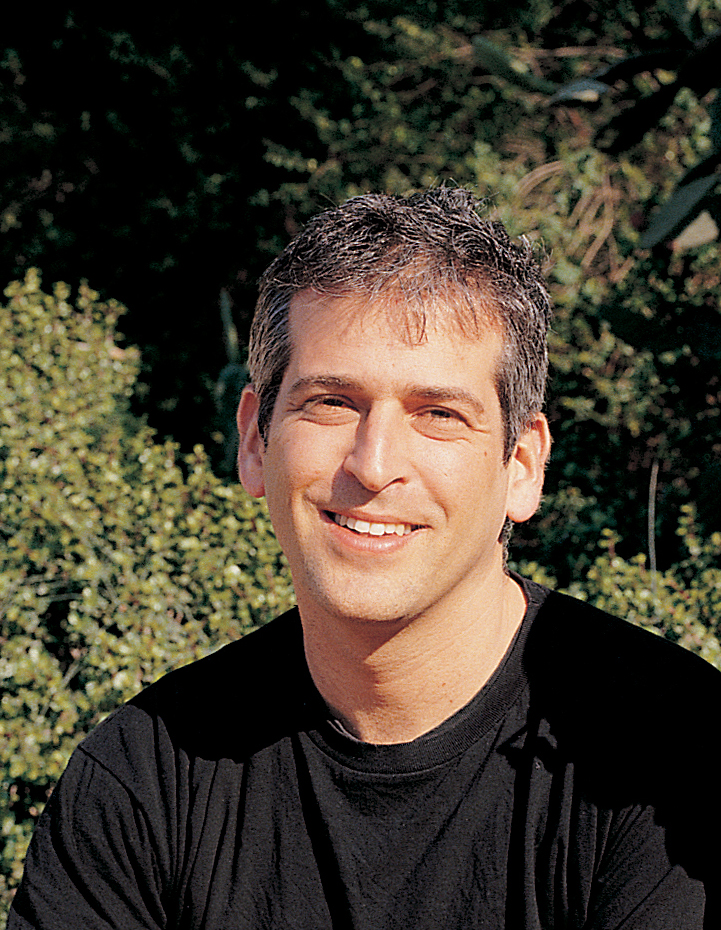
- Born: 1969 (age 56–57)
- Education: Hebrew University of Jerusalem; Weizmann Institute of Science
- Known for: Network motifs
- Awards: Overton Prize (2004)
- Scientific career
- Workplaces: Weizmann Institute of Science; Princeton University
- Doctoral advisor: David Mukamel
- Other academic advisors: Dov Shvarts; Stanislas Leibler
- Doctoral students: Ron Milo
- Website: www.weizmann.ac.il/mcb/UriAlon

Uri Alon (Hebrew: אורי אלון; born 1969) is an Israeli systems biologist and professor at the Weizmann Institute of Science. His highly cited research investigates gene expression, network motifs and the design principles of biological networks in Escherichia coli and other organisms using both computational biology and traditional experimental wet laboratory techniques.

== Education ==
Alon earned his bachelor's and master's degrees from the Hebrew University of Jerusalem and his Ph.D. degree in theoretical physics from the Weizmann Institute of Science.

== Career ==
After having his interest in biology sparked, Alon headed to Princeton University for his postdoctoral work in experimental biology. He returned to the Weizmann Institute as a professor.

Alon features in several popular videos on YouTube such as Sunday at the Lab (with Michael Elowitz) and How to Give a Good Talk. As of 2011, he is the author of the most highly bookmarked scientific paper on CiteULike How To Choose a Good Scientific Problem and How to Build a Motivated Research Group.

In 2021 he was appointed visiting professor in the bioengineering department of Stanford University. He is a member of the IBS Biomedical Mathematics Group.

== Research ==
Alon has contributed to the understanding of gene regulatory networks and generalized the term network motif in 2002.

Together with his team, he reunited different theories of endocrine feedback loops by introducing the closely related concepts of "dynamical compensation" and "autoimmune surveillance of hypersecreting mutants". The theories are able to explain a plethora of phenomena ranging from circannual endocrine rhythms over type 2 diabetes and other common endocrine disorders to alcohol addiction and age-related diseases.

== Awards ==
In 2004 Alon was awarded the Overton Prize for "outstanding accomplishment by a scientist in the early to mid stage of his or her career" by the International Society for Computational Biology. Alon has also been awarded:

- Moore Fellowship, California Institute of Technology (2000)
- EMBO Young Investigator Award (2001)
- IBM Faculty Award (2003)
- Minerva Junior Research Group on Biological Computation (2003)
- Morris L. Levinson Award in Biology (2003)
- Teva Founders Prize (2005)
- European Molecular Biology Organization membership (2007)
- Radcliffe Institute for Advanced Study fellow 2009
- HFSP Nakasone Award (2014)
