= Mathieu Blanchette (computational biologist) =

Computational biologist and professor

- Born: Mathieu Daniel Blanchette
- Education: Université de Montréal (BSc, MSc); University of Washington (PhD)
- Awards: Overton Prize (2006); Sloan Fellowship (2007)
- Scientific career
- Fields: Bioinformatics; Genomics; Evolution
- Workplaces: McGill University; University of California, Santa Cruz
- Thesis: Algorithms for phylogenetic footprinting (2002)
- Doctoral advisor: Martin Tompa
- Other academic advisors: David Sankoff; David Haussler
- Website: www.cs.mcgill.ca/~blanchem/

Mathieu Daniel Blanchette is a computational biologist and Director of the School of Computer Science at McGill University. His research focuses on developing new algorithms for the detection of functional regions in DNA sequences.

== Education ==
Blanchette studied mathematics and computer science at Bachelor of Science (1997) level, before studying computer science at Master of Science (1998) level, both at the Université de Montréal. He gained his PhD in computer science from the University of Washington in 2002, under the supervision of Martin Tompa. His thesis, titled Algorithms for phylogenetic footprinting, presented the first reasonable algorithm for gene order phylogeny and elaborated on phylogenetic footprinting. Following this, he worked as a postdoctoral researcher at the Center for Biomolecular Science and Engineering at the University of California, Santa Cruz, working with David Haussler.

== Research ==
Blanchette became Associate Professor in the McGill University School of Computer Science in 2002. His research focuses on developing computational methods for detecting functional regions in DNA sequences. His postdoctoral work developed algorithms for reconstructing ancestral mammalian genomes. His recent work continues this path, particularly with regard to developing algorithms for inferring gene regulation.

== Awards and honours ==
Blanchette was awarded the ISCB Overton Prize in 2006, recognising his "fundamental, highly cited contributions in several areas of bioinformatics". He was awarded a Sloan Research Fellowship in 2007.

Blanchette has served on the Editorial Board of the journal Genome Research and as of 2014, serves on the Editorial Board of the journal Algorithms for Molecular Biology.
