= Curtis Huttenhower =

American biologist (born 1981)

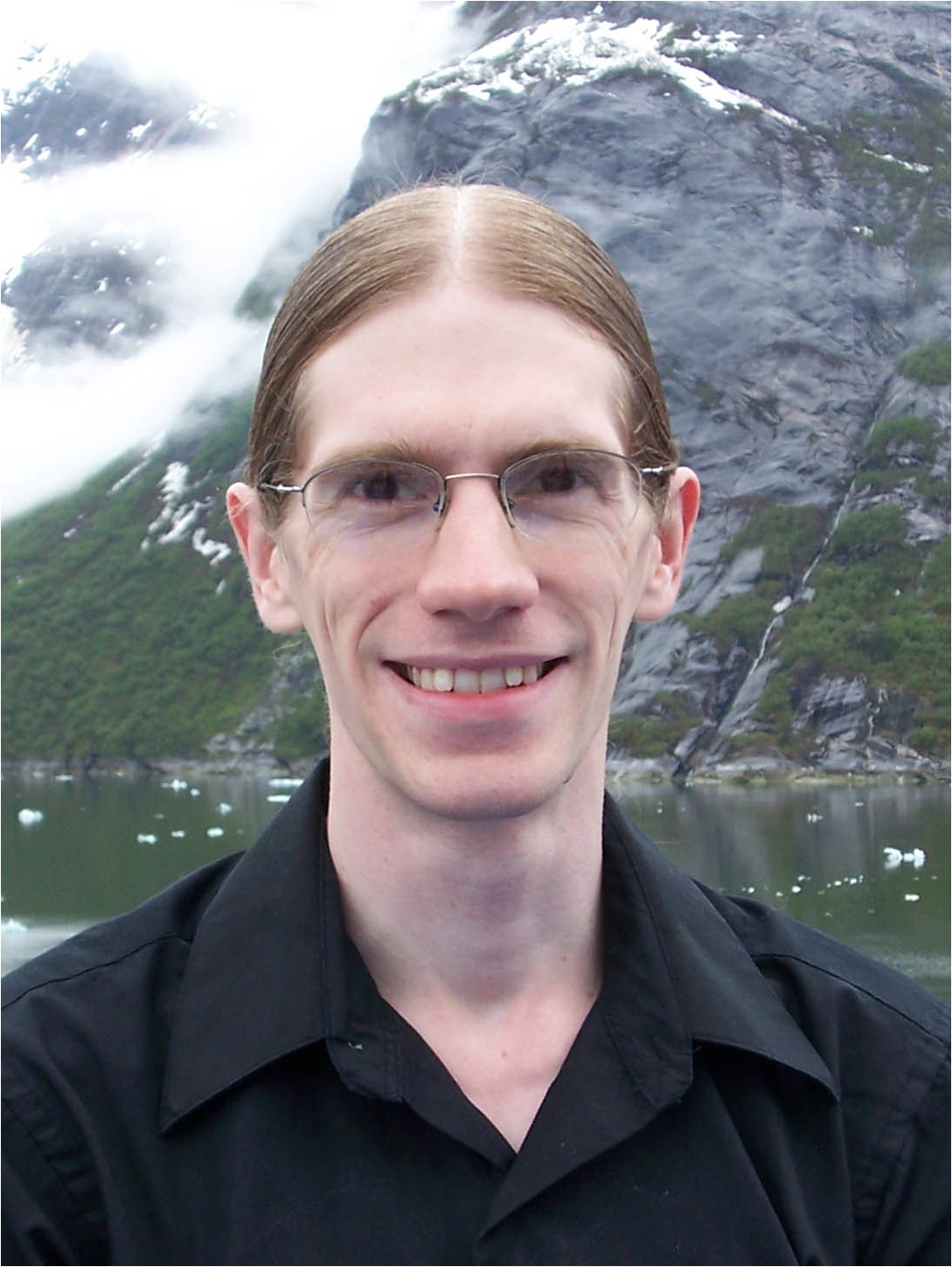
- Born: June 18, 1981 (age 45)
- Education: Rose-Hulman Institute of Technology (BS); Carnegie Mellon University (MS); Princeton University (PhD)
- Awards: Overton Prize (2015)
- Scientific career
- Fields: Computational metagenomics; Human microbiome; Biological data mining
- Workplaces: Harvard University
- Thesis: Analysis of large genomic data collections (2009)
- Doctoral advisor: Olga Troyanskaya
- Website: huttenhower.sph.harvard.edu

Curtis Huttenhower (born June 18, 1981) is a computational biologist who serves as Professor of Computational Biology and Bioinformatics in the Department of Biostatistics, School of Public Health, Harvard University. He will be moving to the University of British Columbia to serve as the Eddie Goldenberg Research Chair of Canada in Microbiome Sciences, with an anticipated start date of summer 2027.

== Education ==
Huttenhower gained his BS from the Rose-Hulman Institute of Technology in 2000, where he majored in computer science, chemistry and mathematics. He then spent two years as a software developer for Microsoft, working on the Microsoft Natural Language Development Platform. Huttenhower gained his MS in computational linguistics from Carnegie Mellon University in 2003, where he studied with Dannie Durand and Eric Nyberg. In 2003, Huttenhower moved to Princeton University where he was awarded a PhD in 2008 for research in genomics supervised by Olga Troyanskaya. His PhD thesis was titled Analysis of large genomic data collections.

== Research ==
Huttenhower joined the Harvard T.H. Chan School of Public Health in 2009 as an assistant professor of computational biology and bioinformatics, becoming an associate professor in 2013. Huttenhower's lab worked extensively with the NIH Human Microbiome Project (HMP) to identify and characterise the microorganisms found in association with both healthy and diseased humans. As of 2015, he co-leads one of the follow-up 'HMP2' Centers for Characterizing the Gut Microbial Ecosystem in Inflammatory Bowel Disease.

== Awards and honors ==
Huttenhower received an NSF CAREER award in 2010 for his research on microbial communities and was awarded a Presidential Early Career Award for Scientists and Engineers in 2012. In 2015, Huttenhower was awarded the Overton Prize from the International Society for Computational Biology. His PhD supervisor Olga Troyanskaya had been awarded the same prize in 2011. Huttenhower is also a member of the editorial boards for the academic journals Genome Biology, Microbiome and BMC Bioinformatics.

== Select publications ==
- Ross, Matthew; García, Nathalia; Bonazzi, Vivien; et al. (2012). "Structure, function and diversity of the healthy human microbiome". Nature. 486 (7402): 207–14. Bibcode:2012Natur.486..207T. doi:10.1038/nature11234. PMC 3564958. PMID 22699609. Wikidata Q24626370.
- Nicola Segata; Izard, Jacques; Waldron, Levi; Gevers, Dirk; Larisa Miropolsky; Garrett, Wendy; Huttenhower, Curtis (2011). "Metagenomic biomarker discovery and explanation". Genome Biology. 12 (6): R60. doi:10.1186/gb-2011-12-6-r60. PMC 3218848. PMID 21702898. Wikidata Q35557728.
- Langille, Morgan; Jesse Zaneveld; J Gregory Caporaso; et al. (2013). "Predictive functional profiling of microbial communities using 16S rRNA marker gene sequences". Nature Biotechnology. 31 (9): 814–821. doi:10.1038/nbt.2676. PMC 3819121. PMID 23975157. Wikidata Q29615050.
