= Susan Ferro-Novick =

American molecular biologist

Susan Ferro-Novick is an American scientist who is a Distinguished Professor of Cellular and Molecular Medicine at the University of California, San Diego. Her research interests focus on the biology of cell membranes and their responses to cell stress, particularly related to membrane trafficking in the secretory and autophagy pathways, as well as a quality control pathway known as ER-phagy in the endoplasmic reticulum.

== Education and academic career ==
Ferro-Novick was a graduate student at the University of California, Berkeley, where she was an early graduate student of the future Nobel Prize winner Randy Schekman. Schekman later remembered her as ambitious and as a standout among the women in his research group. She began her faculty career at Yale University and later moved to the University of California, San Diego.

Ferro-Novick was a Howard Hughes Medical Institute Investigator from 1994 to 2016. She was elected to the American Academy of Arts and Sciences in 2012, recognized for her work in characterizing the transport protein particle (TRAPP) complex.

== Personal life ==
Ferro-Novick is married to fellow scientist and UCSD professor Peter Novick.
