= Tanja Kortemme =

Computational biologist

- Education: Leibniz University Hannover (BSc, MSc, PhD)
- Known for: Rosetta
- Honors: American Institute for Medical and Biological Engineering College of Fellows

Tanja Kortemme is a bioengineering professor at University of California, San Francisco. She has been recognized for outstanding contributions in computational protein design, including energy functions, sampling algorithms, and molecules to rewire cellular control circuits. She was an inaugural Chan Zuckerberg Biohub investigator and was inducted into American Institute for Medical and Biological Engineering College of Fellows.

== Education ==
Kortemme earned her Bachelor of Science in biochemistry at the University of Hannover before earning her diploma and doctorate in biochemistry. She then completed a postdoctoral fellowship in Heidelberg, and joined the University of Washington as a computation associate. After four years at the University of Washington, Kortemme accepted a job at the University of California, San Francisco.

== Career ==
Kortemme joined the University of California, San Francisco School of Pharmacy as an assistant professor in 2004. The following year, she was awarded the Sloan Research Fellowship by the Alfred P. Sloan Foundation. She later received the NSF Career Award in 2008. In 2011, Kortemme received funding to conduct further research on biosensors that detect and respond to small molecules inside cells.

In 2017, she was named an inaugural Chan Zuckerberg Biohub investigator. In 2019, Kortemme was inducted into American Institute for Medical and Biological Engineering College of Fellows.
