= Martin Steinegger (scientist) =

Bioinformatician and associate professor at Seoul National University

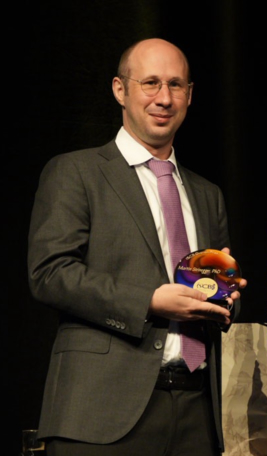
- Steinegger receiving the Overton Prize at the Intelligent Systems for Molecular Biology (ISMB) conference in 2024
- Education: Technical University of Munich (PhD); LMU Munich (BSc, MSc)
- Known for: MMseqs2, Linclust, ColabFold, Foldseek
- Awards: Overton Prize (2024)
- Scientific career
- Fields: Bioinformatics
- Workplaces: Seoul National University; Johns Hopkins University School of Medicine; Max Planck Institute for Biophysical Chemistry
- Thesis: Ultrafast and sensitive sequence search and clustering methods in the era of next generation sequencing (2018)
- Doctoral advisor: Johannes Söding
- Other academic advisors: Steven Salzberg

Martin Steinegger is a bioinformatician and associate professor in the School of Biological Sciences at Seoul National University. His research focuses on computational methods for large-scale analysis of biological sequence and structure data. He is known for developing the bioinformatics tools MMseqs2, Linclust, ColabFold, and Foldseek, and contributed to the development of AlphaFold2. In 2024, he received the Overton Prize from the International Society for Computational Biology.

== Education and career ==
Steinegger studied bioinformatics at the Technical University of Munich and LMU Munich. He completed a PhD in computer science at the Technical University of Munich in 2018 under the supervision of Johannes Söding, with research carried out at the Max Planck Institute for Biophysical Chemistry. He was then a postdoctoral fellow in the laboratory of Steven Salzberg at Johns Hopkins University School of Medicine. In 2020, he joined Seoul National University as assistant professor.

== Research ==
With Johannes Söding, Steinegger developed MMseqs2, a software suite for protein sequence searching and clustering, and Linclust, which clusters protein sequence datasets in linear time. These tools are used in resources including UniRef, NCBI ClusteredNR, and RCSB PDB sequence clusters. His Conterminator software, built on MMseqs2, was used to identify over two million contaminated or mislabeled database entries.

He later co-developed ColabFold, an open platform described as making AlphaFold2 protein structure prediction more accessible to experimental biologists. He also co-developed Foldseek, a tool for protein structure search. Nature Methods described Foldseek as a major acceleration in protein structure database searches, while Nature reported on its adoption as the search tool for the AlphaFold Protein Structure Database. In 2026, Nature reported that Steinegger was part of a consortium with EMBL-EBI, Google DeepMind, and NVIDIA that expanded the AlphaFold database to include homodimer predictions.

Steinegger co-authored the 2021 Nature paper on AlphaFold and contributed the BFD sequence database used in the system.

== Awards and honors ==
- Overton Prize, International Society for Computational Biology (2024)
- Asan Award in Medicine (Young Medical Scientists), Asan Foundation (2026)
- Highly Cited Researcher, Clarivate (2024, 2025)
