= Twister =

Twister most commonly refers to a tornado.

Twister, or Twisters, or The Twisters may also refer to:

== Animals ==
- Twister (fish), common name for the Bellapiscis medius species of fish
- Twister (dragonfly), common name for the Tholymis tillarga species of dragonfly

== Entertainment ==
- Twister (1989 film), a comedy film starring Suzy Amis and Crispin Glover
- Twister (1996 film), a disaster film starring Helen Hunt and Bill Paxton
  - Twister (soundtrack), the music from the 1996 movie
  - Twister...Ride It Out, a ride in Universal Studios Florida based on the film
  - Twisters (film), the 2024 sequel to the 1996 film
    - The music was released as a soundtrack, Twisters: The Album, and as a score album, Twisters (score)
    - The Twisters (film), 2024 American action film, a mockbuster of Twisters by The Asylum
  - Template:Twister (franchise), the Wikipedia navbox about all of these
- Twister roller coaster, a layout which tends to twist or interweave its track within itself several times
- Twister (Knoebels Amusement Resort), a roller coaster in Elysburg, Pennsylvania
- Twister (Lake Compounce), a roller coaster in Bristol and Southington, Connecticut
- Twister (Gröna Lund), a roller coaster in Stockholm, Sweden
- Twister III: Storm Chaser, a roller coaster at Elitch Gardens in Denver, Colorado
- Twister (comics), a superhero character from Blue Bolt Comics and Project Superpowers
- Twister (play), a 1999 play by Ken Kesey

=== Games ===
- Twister (game), "the game that ties you up in knots"
- Twister (video game), AKA Mother of Charlotte, 1986 shoot 'em up

=== Music ===
==== Bands ====
- Twister (band), Brazilian, pop rock
- The Twisters (Canadian band), blues
- Los Twisters, Chilean, rock 'n' roll
- Joey and the Twisters, a predecessor to The Royal Teens

==== Albums ====
- Twister (album), by Unrest, 1988
- Twister (Watershed album), 1995
- Twister, by Leisure (band), 2019

==== Songs ====
- "Twister", on the 1988 "Weird Al" Yankovic album Even Worse
- "Twister", a song by Mariah Carey from the 2001 soundtrack Glitter
- "Twister", a 1993 single by Watershed (American band)
- "Twister", a song by Gigi Perez from the album At the Beach, in Every Life

=== Television ===
- Twister, a 2001 children's/animation show by Scottish Television, broadcast in the 2009 programming strand wknd@stv
- "Twister" (2011), episodes 17–19 of season 3 of Disney Channel series The Suite Life on Deck
- Maurice "Twister" Rodriguez, one of the main characters in 1999–2004 Nickelodeon series Rocket Power
- Mo Twister, the professional name of Mohan Gumatay, a Filipino American radio and television presenter (born 1977)

== Food ==
- Twister (ice cream), made by Unilever's Heartbrand
- Twister (pastry), a cruller
- Twisters (restaurant), a New Mexican restaurant chain

== Sports ==
- Spinal lock § Twister, a move in combat sports, similar to the guillotine in wrestling
- Twister City Roller Derby (TCRD), a flat-track roller derby league based in Oklahoma City, Oklahoma
- Twin City Twisters (TCT), an artistic gymnastics facility in Champlin, Minnesota

=== Teams ===
- Massachusetts Twisters, an American indoor soccer team based in West Springfield, Massachusetts
- Arkansas Twisters, an American indoor football team based in Little Rock, which eventually became the Texas Revolution
- Indiana Twisters (originally Indianapolis Twisters), an American indoor soccer team
- Pembina Valley Twisters, a Canadian junior ice hockey team based in Morris, Manitoba
- Holzgerlingen Twister, an American football team from Holzgerlingen, Germany
- Torrington Twisters, an American baseball team based in Torrington, Connecticut, which became the New Bedford Bay Sox

== Technology ==
- Twister (software), a decentralized P2P microblogging platform
- Twister (Software from Brokat AG), a modular e-services framework
- Mersenne Twister (MT), a pseudo-random number generator
- Twister OS, a Linux-based operating system
- Twister (microarchitecture), the CPU of the Apple A9
- Ronja Twister, an electronics module for free space optic
- Twister Telecom, a Mexican company
- Twister supersonic separator, hydrocarbon processing system for the dehydration and dewpointing of natural gas

== Transportation ==
- Twister (yacht), a sailing keelboat
- Honda CB Twister, a motorcycle

=== Aviation ===
- Pipistrel Twister, a Slovenian ultralight trike
- Silence Twister, a German homebuilt aircraft design
- Wings of Change Twister, an Austrian paraglider design
- Payne Knight Twister, an American aerobatic sport aircraft

== Other uses ==
- Twister (tree), a candidate for the oldest limber pine (Pinus flexilis) near the Alta Ski Area in Utah
- Twister ribozyme, a catalytic RNA structure capable of self-cleavage
- Twister, an occupation represented by the Amalgamated Association of Beamers, Twisters and Drawers (Hand and Machine)
- Draw twister, a machine used to draw and twist large quantities of polymer fibers
- Twister Falls, a waterfall in Hood River County, Oregon

== See also ==
- Twist (disambiguation)
- Twistor theory
- Twista (born 1973), American rapper
- Anti-twister (disambiguation)
- Mister Twister (disambiguation)
- Ultra Twister (disambiguation)
- Tongue twister
- Troubletwisters (book series), a 2011 young adult fantasy series by Garth Nix and Sean Williams
