= Twistie =

Twistie or twisties may refer to:

- Twist tie, a type of re-usable fastener
- Twisties, a snack food made by Smith's Snackfood Company
- In artistic gymnastics, the twisties are a sudden loss of a gymnast's ability to maintain body control during aerial maneuvers
- In glass art, a type of lamp blowing raw material glass rod formed from twisted strands of coloured glass
- In computing, a user interface with a triangle shape that twists to reveal more data

== See also ==
- Twist (disambiguation)
- Twisted (disambiguation)
