= Twist =

Twist may refer to:

== In arts and entertainment ==
=== Film, television, and stage ===
- Twist (2003 film), an independent film loosely based on Charles Dickens's novel Oliver Twist
- Twist (2021 film), a modern rendition of Oliver Twist starring Rafferty Law
- The Twist (1976 film), a film co-written and directed by Claude Chabrol
- The Twist (1992 film), a documentary film directed by Ron Mann
- Twist (stage play), a 1995 stage thriller by Miles Tredinnick
- Twist, the main character on television series The Fresh Beat Band and its spin-off Fresh Beat Band of Spies
- Oliver Twist (disambiguation), name of several film, television, and musical adaptations based on Charles Dickens's novel Oliver Twist
- "Twist" (Only Murders in the Building), a 2021 episode of the TV series Only Murders in the Building
- Jack Twist, a character in the 2005 film Brokeback Mountain
- Twist Morgan, a character in the television series Spaced

=== Music ===
- Twist (album), a 1994 album by New Zealand singer-songwriter Dave Dobbyn
- The Twist (album), a 1984 album by Danish indiepop band Gangway
- "The Twist" (song), a song by Hank Ballard, covered by Chubby Checker, a hit in 1960
- "The Twist", a song from the album Grow Up and Blow Away by Metric
- "The Twist", a song from the album Coming Back Hard Again by hip hop band The Fat Boys
- "Twist" (Phish song), from the 2000 album Farmhouse by Phish
- "Twist" (Goldfrapp song), a single from the 2003 album Black Cherry by Goldfrapp
- Twist, an album by Chris & Cosey
- "Twist", a song from the album Unfinished Business by Nathan Sykes
- "Twist" a song from the album A Hundred Days Off by Underworld
- "Twist", the opener of the 1996 Korn album, Life Is Peachy
- "Twisting", a song from the album Flood by They Might Be Giants
- Twist (band), a rock band from Birmingham, England, UK

=== Other media ===
- Twist ending, an unexpected conclusion or climax to a work of fiction
- Twist (magazine), an American teen magazine
- Twist (Cano novel), a novel by Harkaitz Cano
- Twist (McCann novel), a novel by Colum McCann
- Twist (Östergren novel), a novel by Klas Östergren
- Twist (TV network), an American television network
- Oliver Twist, a novel by Charles Dickens, and its main character

== Finance ==
- Transaction Workflow Innovation Standards Team (TWIST), a non-profit financial industry standards group
- Operation Twist, an effort (in 1961, and again in 2011) by the U.S. Federal Reserve to lower long-term interest rates

== Mathematics, science, and technology ==
- Axial twist theory, a proposed scientific theory
- Serre twist on a graded module or projective scheme
- Twist (mechanics), the torsion of an object
- Twist (differential geometry), a geometric quantity associated with a ribbon
- Twists of curves, a method of deriving related curves
- Twist (rational trigonometry), in Wildberger's Divine Proportions: Rational Trigonometry to Universal Geometry
- Twist (screw theory), in applied mathematics and physics
- Twist (software), a test automation solution by ThoughtWorks Studios
- Ellipse Twist, a French hang glider
- Twist fungus (Dilophospora alopecuri)
- Twisting properties, in statistics
- Twist transcription factor, a gene protein

== People ==
- Barry McGee (born 1966), also known as Twist, painter and graffiti artist
- Leroy "Twist" Casey (born 1973), disk jockey
- Liz Twist (born 1956), British Member of Parliament
- Susan Twist (born 1956), British actress
- Tony Twist (born 1968), Canadian hockey player

== Places ==
- Twist, Arkansas, a city in the United States
- Twist, Germany, a municipality in Lower Saxony

== Sport ==
- Aerial twist, an acrobatic maneuver in gymnastics
- Twist lifts, a type of lift in pairs figure skating

== Other uses ==
- Twist (cocktail garnish), a decorative piece of citrus zest
- Twist (confectionery), a Norwegian bag of sweets, now produced in Sweden
- Twist (dance), a rock and roll dance
- Twist (poker), a special round in some variants of stud poker
- Twist (ride), a popular amusement ride, often seen on travelling funfairs
- French twist (hairstyle), a hair styling technique
- Twist tobacco, a type of chewing tobacco
- Sail twist, a phenomenon in sailing
- Wing twist, a design choice in aeronautics

== See also ==
- Twisted (disambiguation)
- Twister (disambiguation)
- Torque
