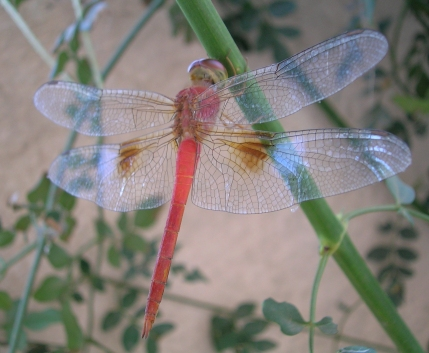
- Tholymis tillarga

Scientific classification
- Kingdom: Animalia
- Phylum: Arthropoda
- Clade: Pancrustacea
- Class: Insecta
- Order: Odonata
- Infraorder: Anisoptera
- Family: Libellulidae
- Subfamily: Trameinae
- Tribe: Zyxommatini
- Genus: Tholymis; Hagen, 1867

= Tholymis =

Genus of dragonflies

Tholymis is a genus of medium-sized dragonflies in the family Libellulidae. Species of Tholymis are tropical, active mostly at dawn and dusk.

== Etymology ==
The genus name Tholymis is possibly derived from the Greek θώραξ (thōrax, "thorax" or "chest") and λυγαῖος (lygaios, "shadowy" or "murky"), together with the common dragonfly suffix -themis. The name may refer to the dark-coloured thorax of males of Tholymis citrina.

== Species ==
The genus Tholymis includes the following species:

Male	Female	Scientific name	Common name	Distribution
		Tholymis citrina Hagen, 1867	Evening Skimmer	Caribbean Sea, Central America, North America, and South America.
		Tholymis tillarga (Fabricius, 1798)	Twister, Coral-tailed Cloud Wing	tropical West Africa to Asia, Australia and the Pacific Islands.
