= Twisted =

Twisted may refer to:

== Film and television ==
- Twisted (1986 film), a horror film by Adam Holender starring Christian Slater
- Twisted (1996 film), a modern retelling of Oliver Twist
- Twisted, a 2011 Singapore Chinese film directed by Chai Yee Wei
- Twisted (2004 film), a thriller starring Ashley Judd and Andy Garcia
- Twisted (TV series), 2013
- Twisted (2026 film), a horror film
- "Twisted" (Star Trek: Voyager), a television episode

== Software and games ==
- Twisted: The Game Show, a 1994 3DO game
- Twisted (software), an event-driven networking framework
- WarioWare: Twisted!, a 2004 game for the Game Boy Advance

== Books ==
- Twisted (short story collection), by crime writer Jeffery Deaver
  - More Twisted, a second short story collection by Deaver
- Twisted (Anderson novel), by Laurie Halse Anderson
- Twisted, a Pretty Little Liars novel by Sara Shepard

== Brands ==
- Creme Egg Twisted, a chocolate bar

== Music ==
- Twisted (musical), a parody of Disney's Aladdin

=== Record labels ===
- Twisted Records (UK), a record label specializing in psychedelic trance
- Twisted Records (U.S.), an electronic music record label

=== Albums ===
- Twisted (Del Amitri album), 1995
- Twisted (Hallucinogen album), 1995

=== Songs ===
- "Twisted" (Annie Ross song), a 1952 jazz song, recorded by Lambert, Hendricks & Ross and covered by Bette Midler, Joni Mitchell and others
- "Twisted" (Brian McFadden song)
- "Twisted" (Gorilla Zoe song)
- "Twisted" (Keith Sweat song)
- "Twisted" (Stevie Nicks song)
- "Twisted" (Vandalism song)
- "Twisted" (Wayne G song)
- "Twisted (Everyday Hurts)", a song by Skunk Anansie
- "Twisted", a song by Avail from their 1992 album Satiate
- "Twisted", a song by Carrie Underwood from her 2007 album Carnival Ride
- "Twisted", a song by Dio from their 1990 album Lock Up the Wolves
- "Twisted", a song by Heidi Montag from her 2010 album Superficial
- "Twisted", a song by Phinehas from their 2013 album The Last Word Is Yours to Speak
- "Twisted", a song by Quiet Riot from their 1995 album Down to the Bone
- "Twisted", a song by Skylar Grey, Eminem & Yelawolf from the 2014 album Shady XV
- "Twisted", a song by Tiffany Foxx
- "Twisted", a song by Dimebag Darrell from the 2017 EP The Hitz
- "Twisted", a song by Linoleum from the 1997 album Dissent

== See also ==
- Twiztid, an American hip hop duo
- Twisted Pixel Games, an America game developer
- Twist (disambiguation)
- Twister (disambiguation)
