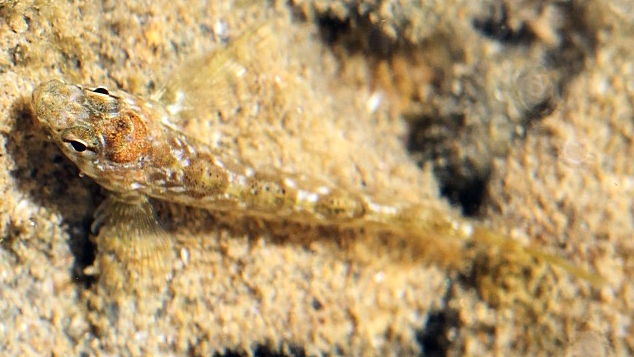
- Bellapiscis medius

Scientific classification
- Kingdom: Animalia
- Phylum: Chordata
- Class: Actinopterygii
- Division: Teleostei
- Order: Blenniiformes
- Family: Tripterygiidae
- Subfamily: Tripterygiinae
- Genus: Bellapiscis; Hardy, 1987

Type species
- Tripterygium medium Günther, 1861

Species
- See text

= Bellapiscis =

Genus of ray-finned fishes

Bellapiscis is a genus of triplefins in the family Tripterygiidae.

== Species ==
- Mottled twister, Bellapiscis lesleyae Hardy, 1987.
- Twister, Bellapiscis medius (Günther, 1861).
