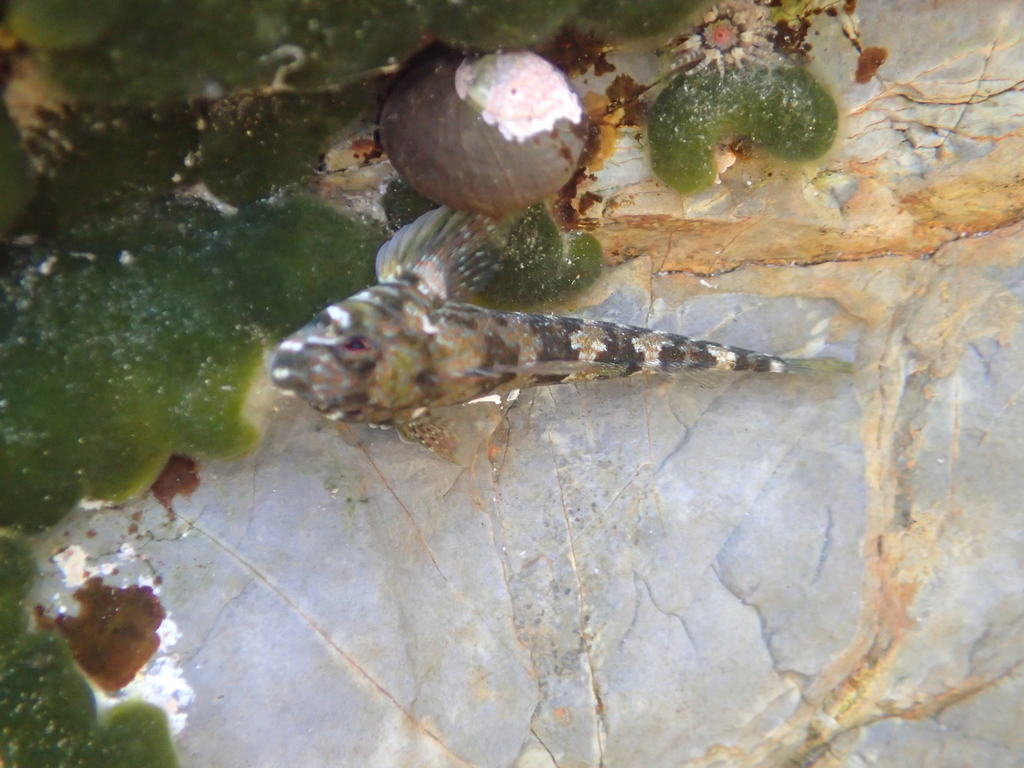

Conservation status
- Least Concern (IUCN 3.1)

Scientific classification
- Kingdom: Animalia
- Phylum: Chordata
- Class: Actinopterygii
- Order: Blenniiformes
- Family: Tripterygiidae
- Genus: Bellapiscis
- Species: B. lesleyae

Binomial name
- Bellapiscis lesleyae Hardy, 1987

= Bellapiscis lesleyae =

Species of fish

Bellapiscis lesleyae, the mottled twister, is a triplefin of the family Tripterygiidae. The specific name of this blenny honours the New Zealand marine biologist Lesley Bolton who helped Hardy (the indentifer of Bellapiscis lesleyae) collect fishes in rockpools on the Taranaki coast of New Zealand, including the type of this species.

== Description ==
Bellapiscis lesleyae adults can grow to a maximum length of 6 cm, reaching 5-5.5 cm by the end of their first year of life.

The body is spindle-shaped, attached to a concave dorsal head. B.lesleyae has three dorsal fins with 18-22 spine rays and 10-15 soft rays. The anal fin is a single fin with 2 spine rays and 17-22 soft rays. The pelvic fins have one spine ray and three soft rays and the pectoral fins have 15-18 soft rays.

Bellapiscis lesleyae has mottled colouration. The head and body are whitish to brown and are patterned with dark spots and saddles. The pectoral, dorsal and caudal fins are translucent and the sides of the body display dark, oblique bands with complementing white streaks. B. lesleyae has rays that contain dark brown or black spots. B. lesleyae has an abundance of ctenoid scales which have comb-like edges covering its body. These scales overlap and increase flexibility in body movement compared to other scale types.

Sexual dimorphism is not prominent in Bellapiscis lesleyae. However, females of B. lesleyae have a larger body width and depth than males of the same size during spawning. Males also have intense red colouration during courting to attract females. Aside from this, there are no distinct differences between males and females of B. lesleyae.

There are several features which differentiate Bellapiscis lelseyae from it sister species, B. medius. B. lesleyae have larger pectoral fins and a lower caudal peduncle than B. medius. B. lesleyae has an irregular checkerboard pattern that extends to the belly whilst B. medius has a more cryptic uniform pattern that is absent on the belly. Males of Bellapiscis lesleyae display bright red colouring on the first dorsal fin and the upper portion of the pectoral fins, particularly during spawning and mating, but this colouration has not been documented in B. medius. Individuals of B. medius have more prominent gills than B. lesleyae, as they are adapted to lower oxygen concentrations and rely more heavily on gill-based respiration. Individuals of Bellapiscis medius occupy the upper zone in the intertidal zone whilst individuals of Bellapiscis lesleyae are found in the lower tidal zone.

== Range ==
Bellapiscis lesleyae is endemic to New Zealand. The recorded distributions of B. lelseyae ranges from the far north in the Three King Islands, to the south including the Chatham Islands and Stewart Island. Individuals of B. lesleyae are also found on both the east and west coasts of New Zealand as well as south of Fiordland.

== Habitat ==
B. lesleyae prefers shallow habitats with high shelter, typically tidal rock pools 0 to 5 m deep. The tidal pool characteristics contain surge zones, mixed algae, and shallow encrusting algae, an ideal environment for B. lesleyae. Bellapiscis lesleyae inhabit the lower tide zone and uses facultative breathing (gulping atmospheric oxygen).

== Ecology ==
=== Life cycle and phenology ===
Breeding season occurs annually from May to September. Individuals of Bellapiscis lelseyae do not form monogamous mating pairs. Females of B. lesleyae take no role in brood care. Males of B. lesleyae court females by aggressive displays of defence in their territory and shows of colouration. Courting displays occur at the beginning of the breeding season and males will lure one or more females into their territory. Females prefer larger males with inviting displays.

B. lesleyae reproduce through external fertilization. Males must provide a substratum for females to deposit eggs. The substratum must provide shelter and protection from disturbance and predation. Once a substratum is selected, the male will release sperm to fertilize deposited eggs. Females of B. lesleyae deposit batches of eggs ranging from hundreds to thousands. Nesting sites can contain eggs laid by more than one female. Observations of habitat use in triplefins including B. lesleyae documented their selection in fine-scale habitats for nesting, such as the sides of rocks or boulders and upside down on the roof of overhangs. B. lesleyae also lay eggs in empty barnacle shells. Overhangs provide less exposure to predatory activity, and rocks and boulders supply gentle currents that can oxygenate eggs without dislodging them. The eggs contain filaments on the outside that can stick to various structures. Males of B. lesleyae are territorial and guard nesting sites.

Individuals of Bellapiscis lesleyae can live for up to 3-4 years. Three to four generations of B. lesleyae can be present in one year. Eggs hatch in the form of larvae. The larvae are planktonic and will float in the water column until they drift to the bottom to settle into a habitat – the pelagic phase. The larvae have highly developed sensory systems in their late stage of growth. Larvae can respond to reef sounds, chemical cues, and floating objects. At this stage in development, larvae are at their competent stage. Larvae have variation in their settlement times, as restrictions of a suitable habitat can delay settlement. Some larvae stay in the pelagic phase longer than others. Bellapiscis lesleyae has an extended pelagic larval duration averaging 55.6 days. Overall, pelagic larval duration can range from 41 to 114 days based on environmental conditions.

Juveniles of Bellapiscis lesleyae settle in the intertidal zone among rocky reefs, tidepools, and seagrass beds between August and December. They are solitary fish and do not migrate. Juveniles reach sexual maturity the same year they grow to a size of roughly 40-45 mm. As juveniles grow, they establish defined adult behaviors and home ranges. A juvenile's diet consists of smaller crustaceans, invertebrates, and zooplankton. Over time, a juvenile's prey will become larger due to the increasing demand for energy needed to grow.

=== Diet and foraging ===
Bellapiscis lesleyae are micro carnivores that feed on various small invertebrates, crustaceans, molluscs, and polychaetes. B. lesleyae rely on their camouflaged colouration and morphological features, such as large tooth height and fast closing jaw movements that aid in capturing prey. Rapid jaw movement minimizes the escape of evasive prey and enhances predatory success.

=== Predators, parasites and diseases ===
There is limited research on predators, diseases and parasites of Bellapiscis lesleyae. However, closely related species in Tripterygiidae have been studied. Triplefin species were discovered as a more common host for larval parasites in comparison to other fish. The parasites live in triplefins as juveniles (larvae), making triplefins an intermediate host. The definitive host for the parasite is larger predators such a birds or fish that will consume triplefins.

Seven closely related species to Bellapiscis lesleyae within the triplefin family were observed with abnormal skeletal structures that caused limitations in growth, development and survival. Deformities consisted of scoliosis (lateral curving of the spine), lordosis (ventral curvature), kyphosis (dorsal curvature), and ankylosis (fusion of the vertebrae). Although abnormal skeletal structures are not considered a disease, they can result from diseases or abiotic factors such as temperature, salinity, pH, low oxygen concentration and pollution.

== Other information ==
The first specimen of Bellapiscis lesleyae was collected by Albert Günther in 1861, which he assigned to “Tripterygium nigripenne”. Many considered the species conspecific to its now-sister species, Bellapiscis medius, until G.B. Hardy officially described them as separate in 1987. One of the main characteristics he used to separate the species was their checkerboard colourations - B.medius's colouration does not extend to the belly, unlike Bellapiscis lesleyae.
