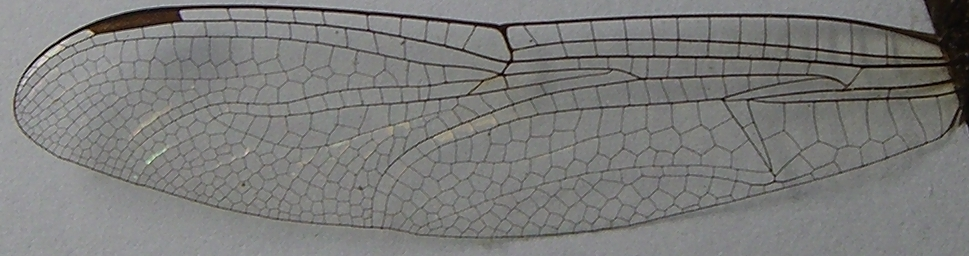

Conservation status
- Least Concern (IUCN 3.1)

Scientific classification
- Kingdom: Animalia
- Phylum: Arthropoda
- Class: Insecta
- Order: Odonata
- Infraorder: Anisoptera
- Family: Libellulidae
- Genus: Tholymis
- Species: T. citrina

Binomial name
- Tholymis citrina Hagen, 1867

= Tholymis citrina =

Species of dragonfly

Tholymis citrina, the evening skimmer, is a species of skimmer in the dragonfly family Libellulidae. It is found in the Caribbean Sea, Central America, North America, and South America.

The IUCN conservation status of Tholymis citrina is "LC", least concern, with no immediate threat to the species' survival. The population is stable. The IUCN status was reviewed in 2017.

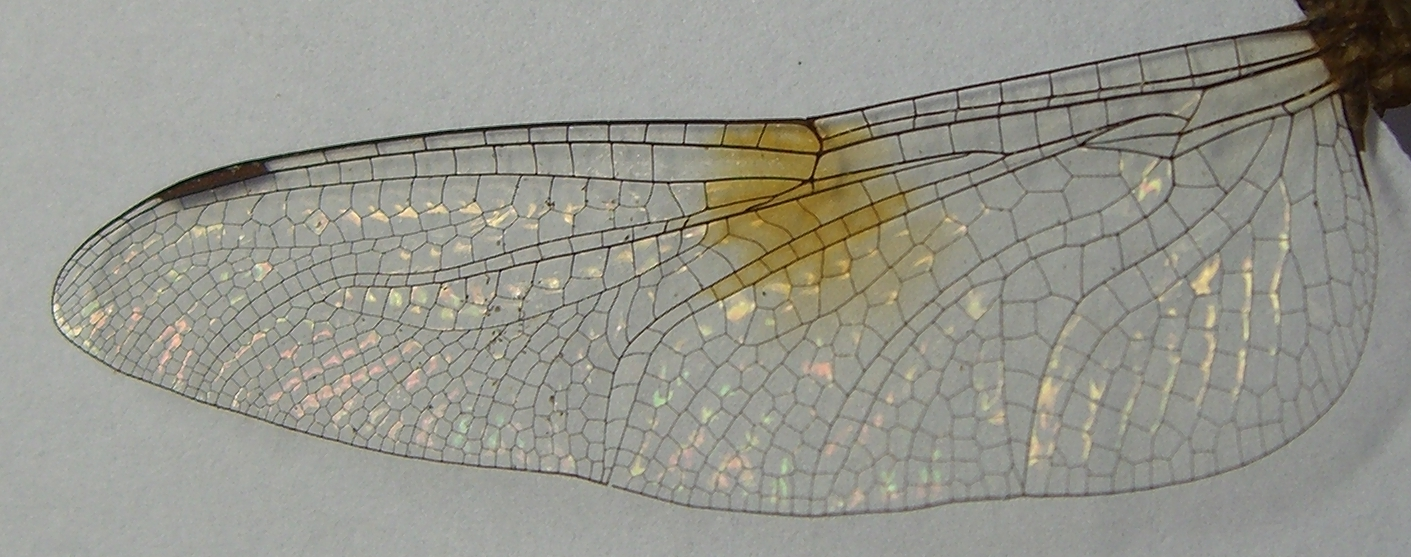
Evening skimmer, Tholymis citrina
