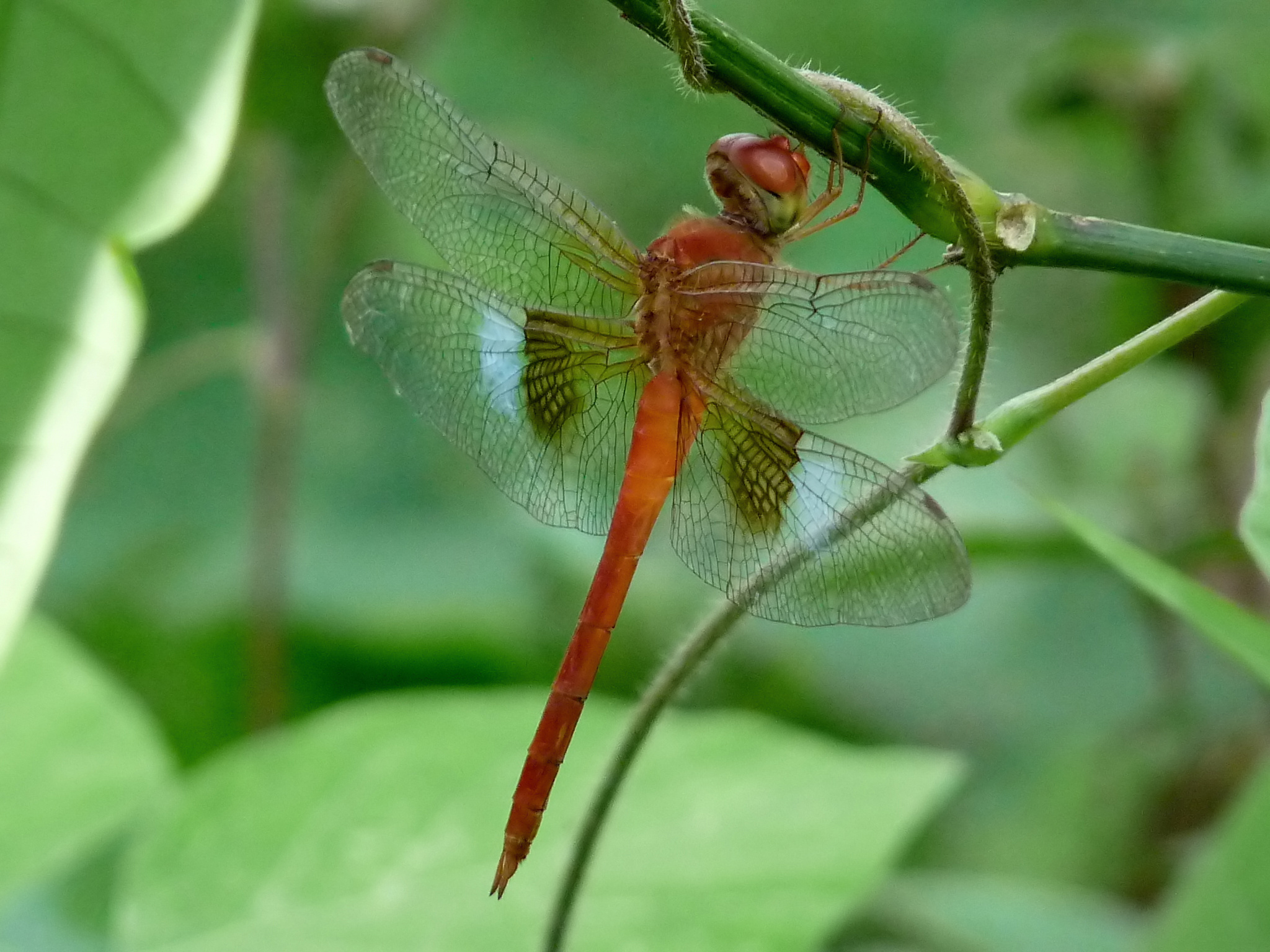
- male
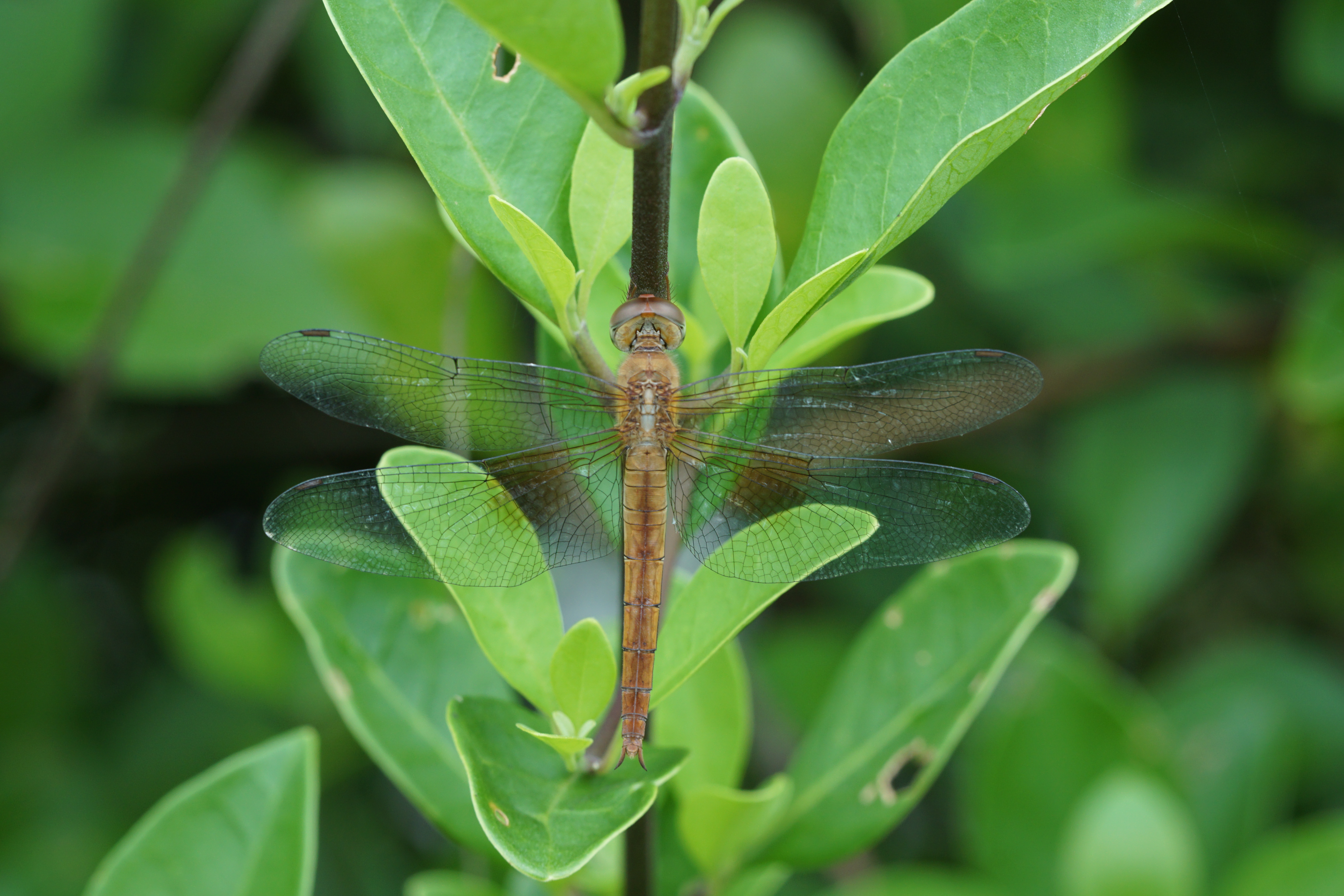
- female

Conservation status
- Least Concern (IUCN 3.1)

Scientific classification
- Kingdom: Animalia
- Phylum: Arthropoda
- Clade: Pancrustacea
- Class: Insecta
- Order: Odonata
- Infraorder: Anisoptera
- Family: Libellulidae
- Genus: Tholymis
- Species: T. tillarga

Binomial name
- Tholymis tillarga (Fabricius, 1798)

Synonyms
- Libellula tillarga Fabricius, 1798; Libellula pallida Palisot de Beauvois, 1805; Libellula bimaculata Desjardins, 1835; Tholymis paratillarga Singh & Prasad, 1980

= Tholymis tillarga =

Species of dragonfly

Tholymis tillarga, the coral-tailed cloudwing, is a species of dragonfly in the family Libellulidae. It is found from tropical West Africa to Asia, Australia and the Pacific Islands. Common names include old world twister, evening skimmer, crepuscular darter, foggy-winged twister, and twister.

== Description and habitat ==
It is a medium sized dragonfly with reddish eyes, yellowish red thorax and coral red abdomen. Its wings are transparent; but hind wings have a golden-brown patch in the base, bordered by a cloudy-white patch. Female is brown and lacks the cloudy-white patch in the hind-wings.

It is a migrant with a permanent presence in humid parts of the tropics. It breeds in standing water-bodies; and prefers weedy ponds, swamps and lakes. They are active at dusk and dawn, as well as during cloudy days.

== Etymology ==
The genus name Tholymis is possibly derived from the Greek θώραξ (thōrax, "thorax" or "chest") and λυγαῖος (lygaios, "shadowy" or "murky"), together with the common dragonfly suffix -themis. The name may refer to the dark-coloured thorax of males of Tholymis citrina.

The derivation of the species name tillarga is unknown.

== Gallery ==
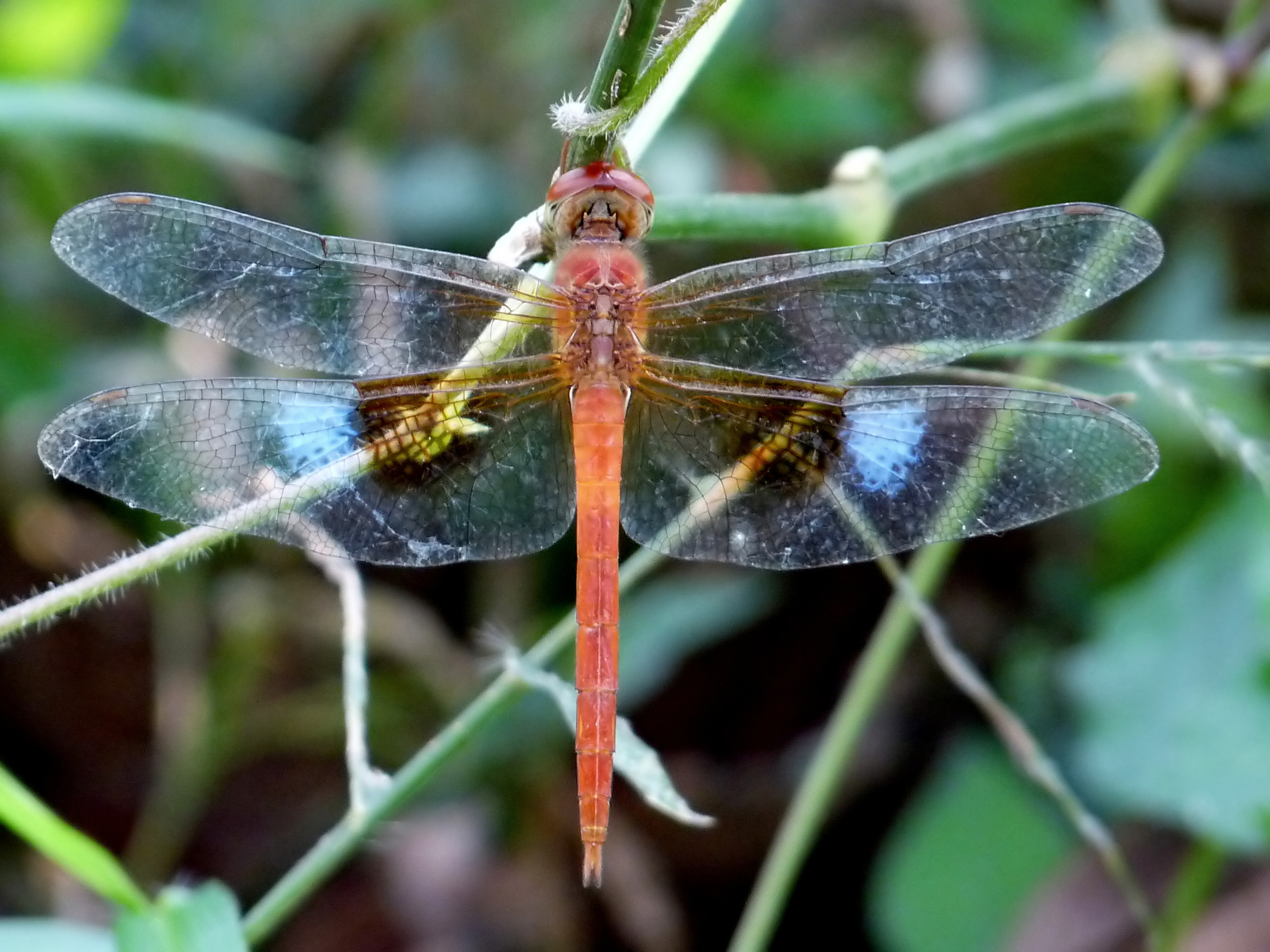
Male showing white patches in wings

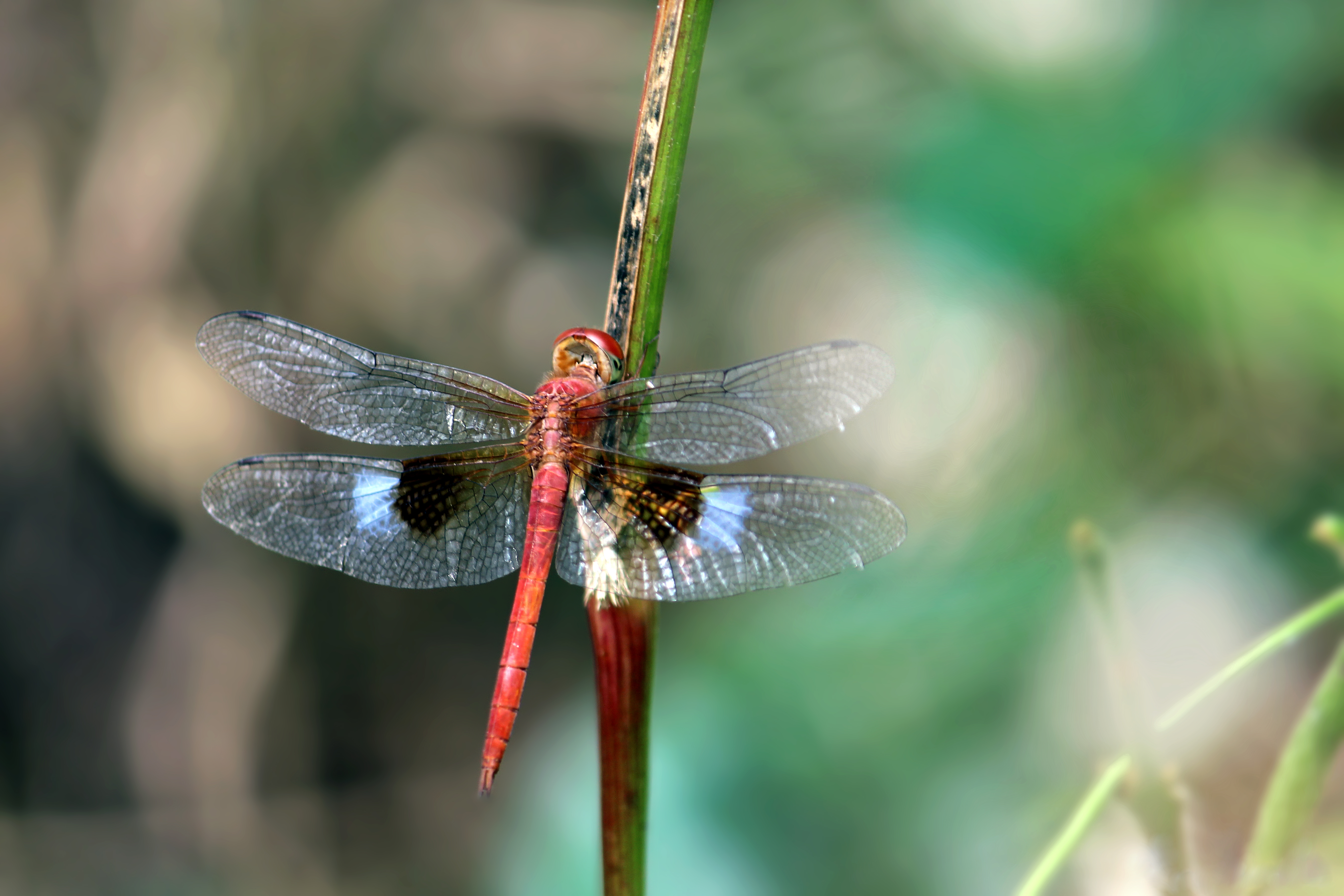
Male

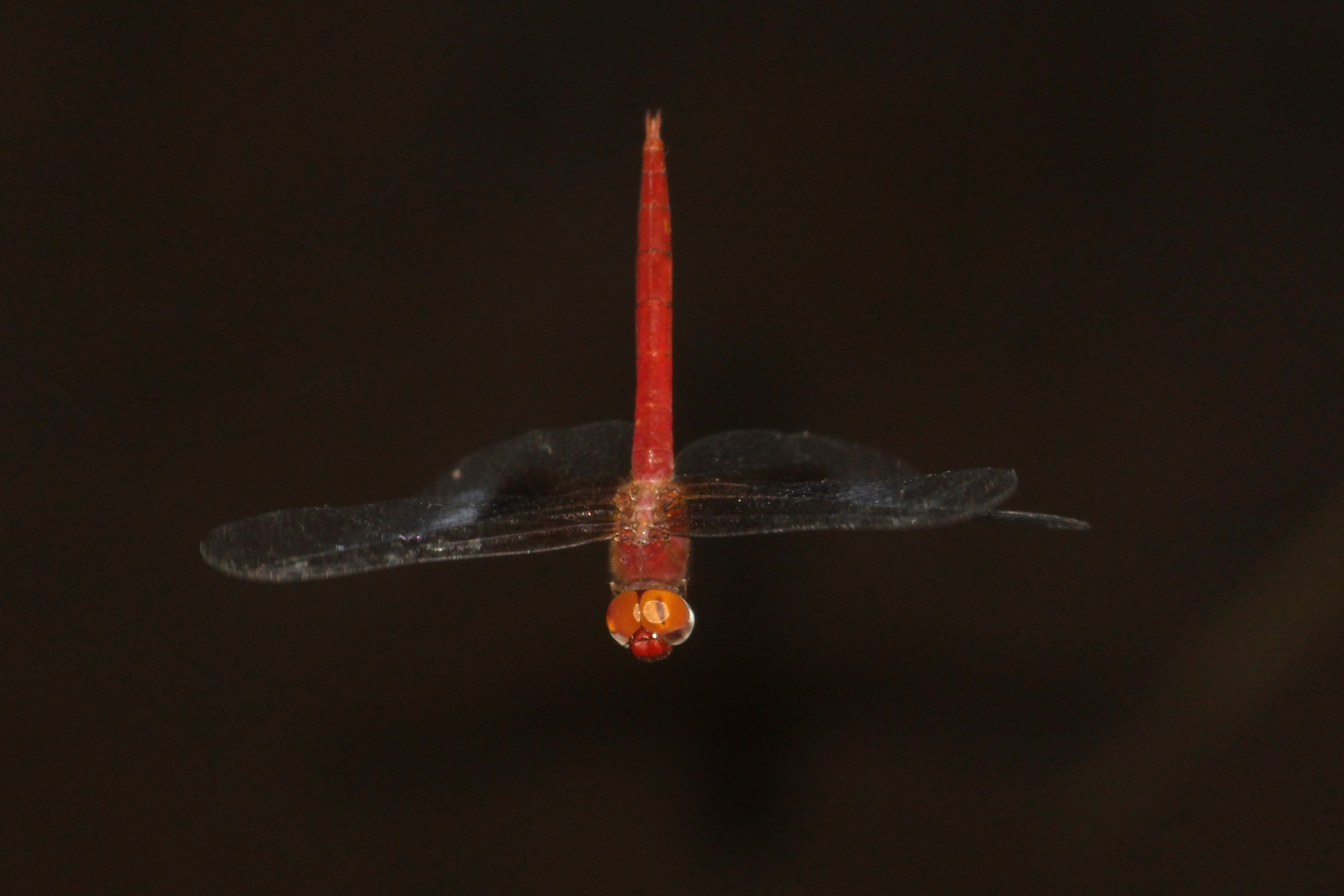
Male flying

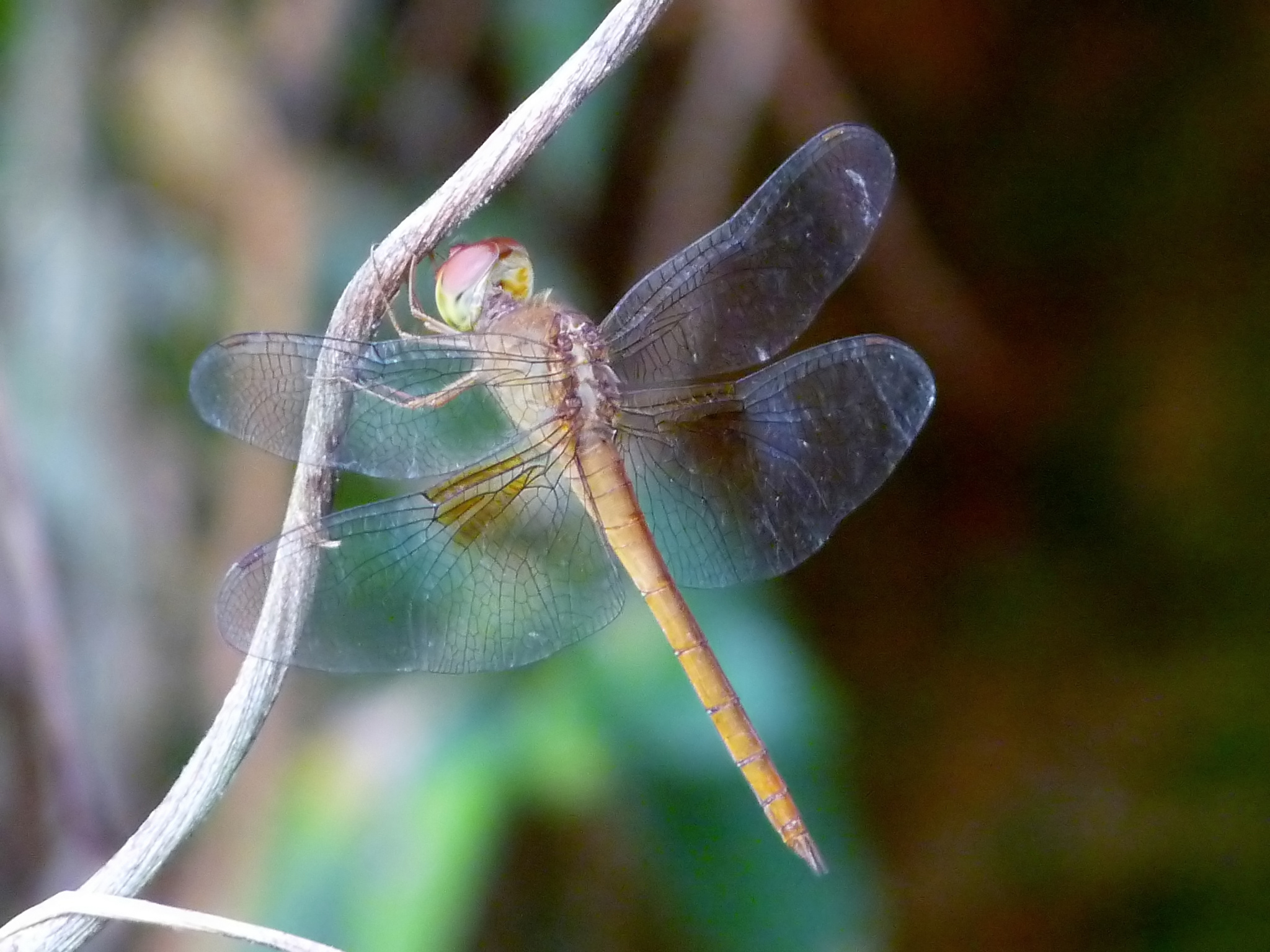
Young male with little colouring in his wings

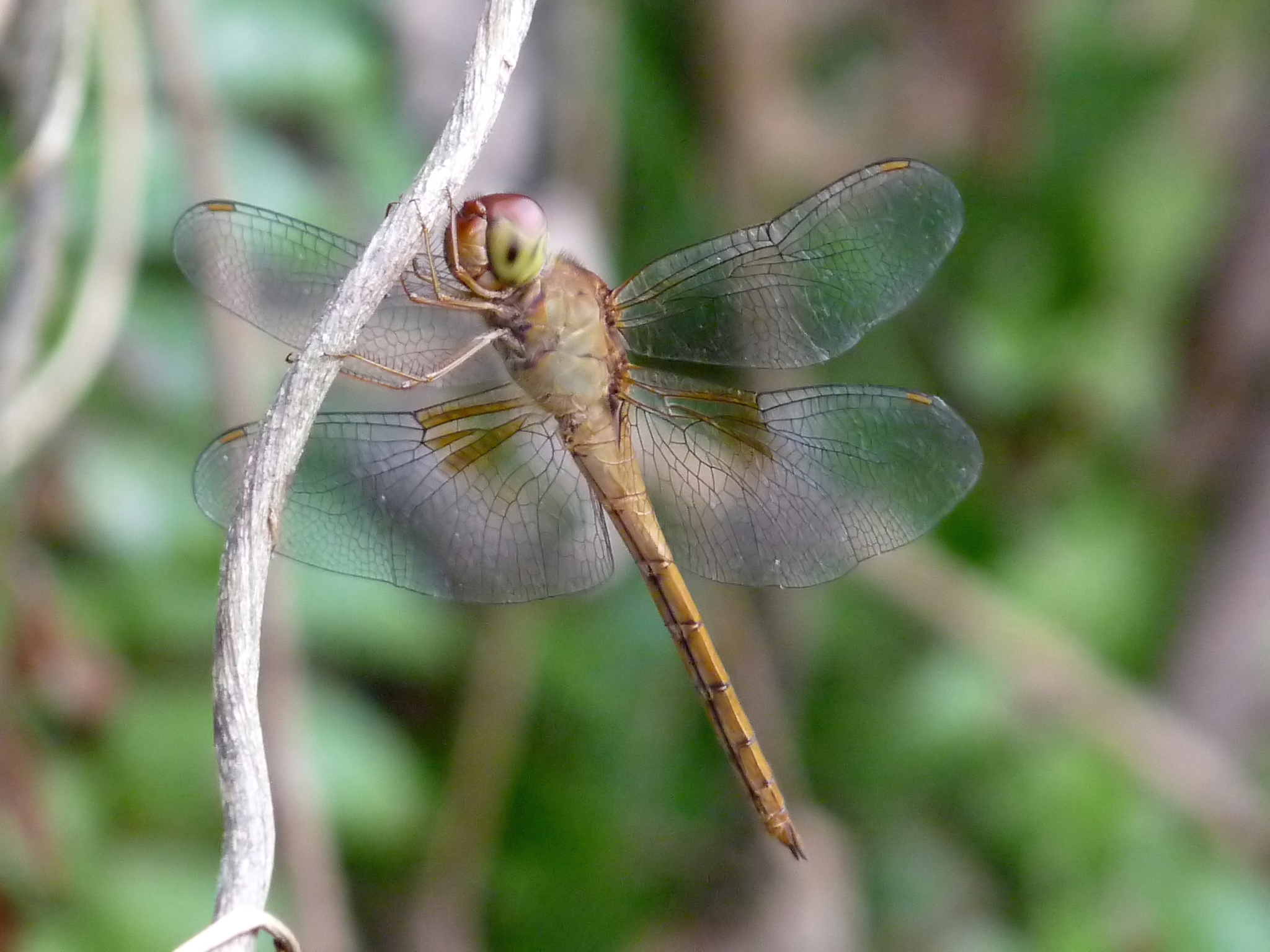
Young male viewed from under

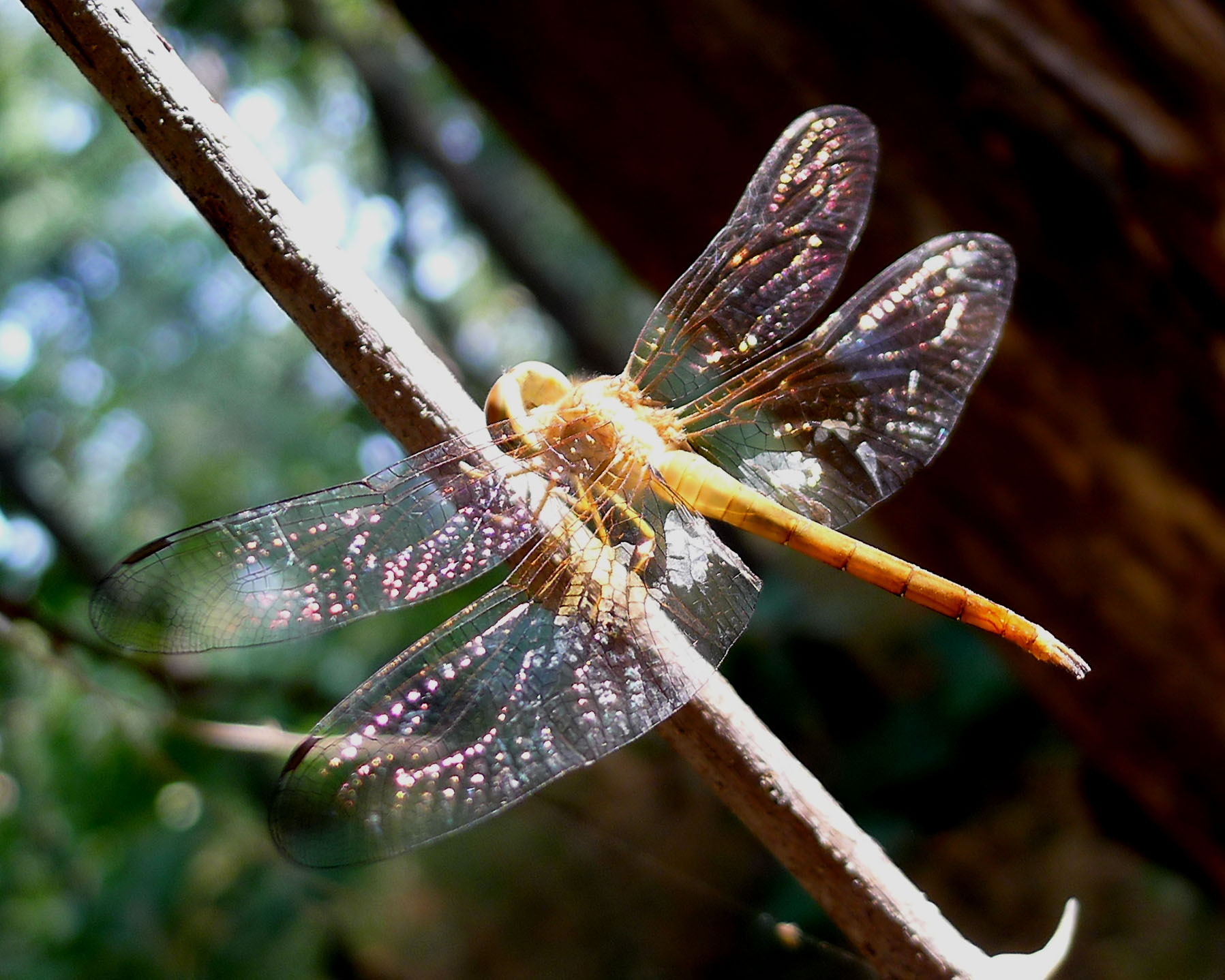
Young male

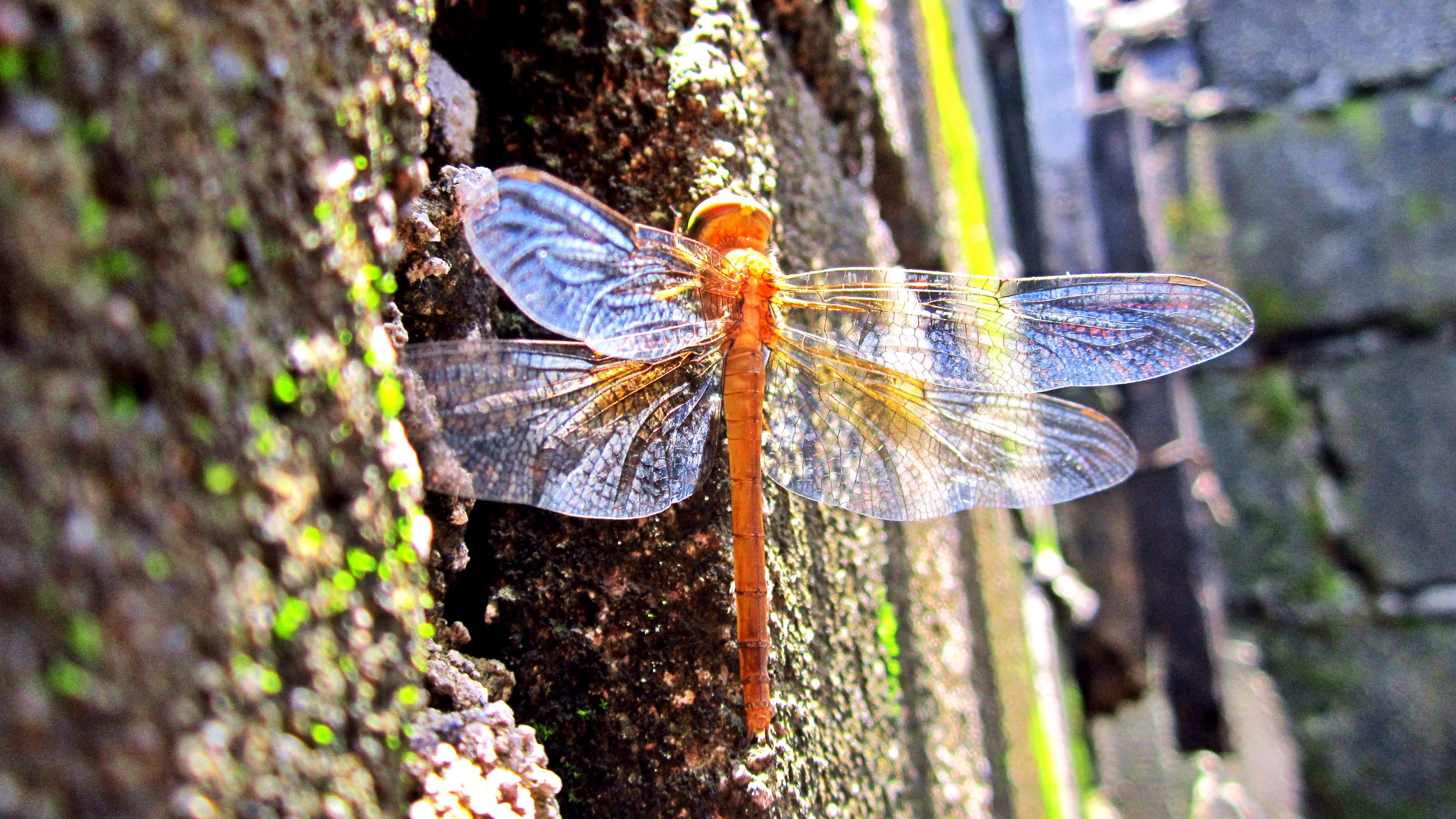
Young female

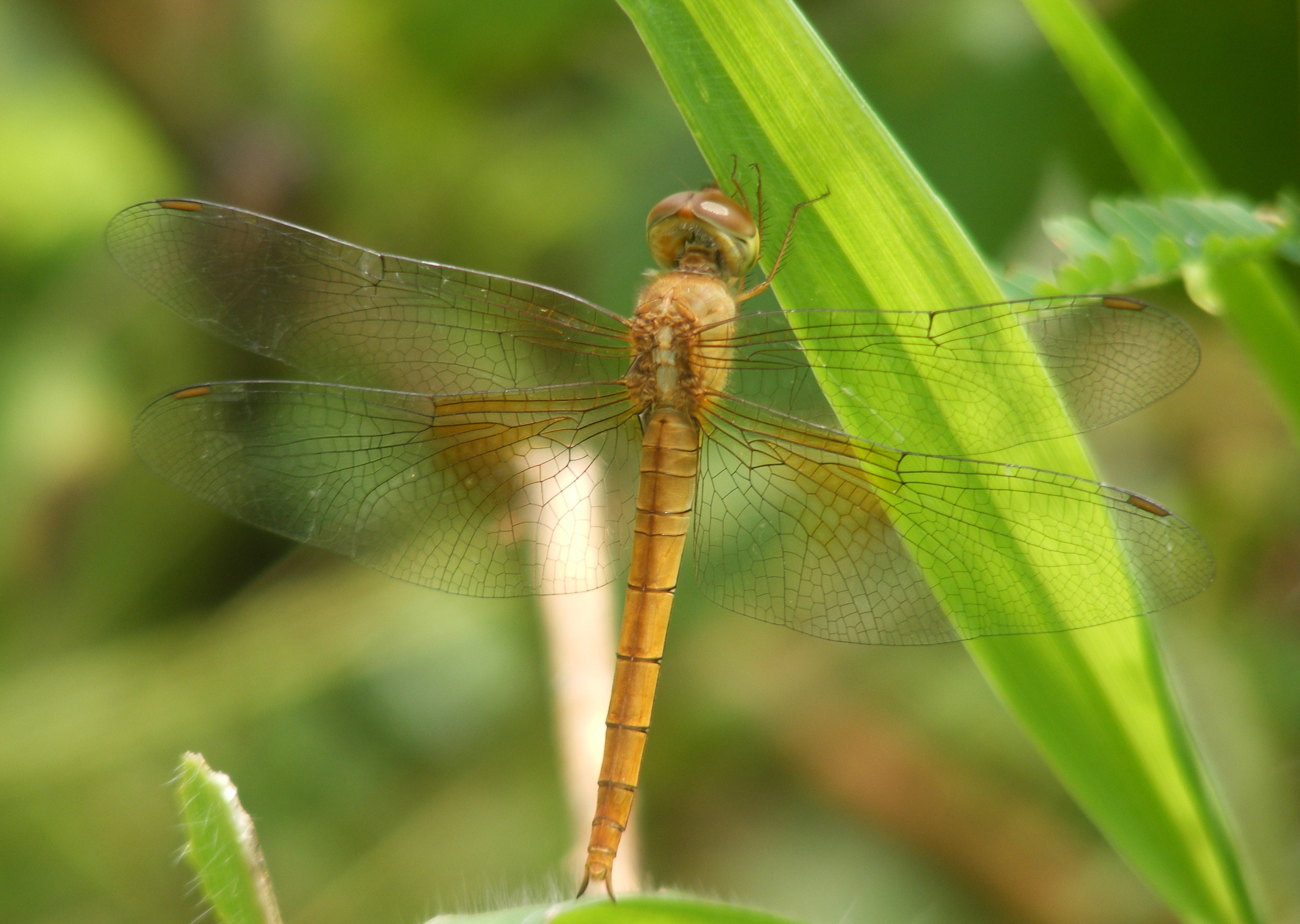
Young female

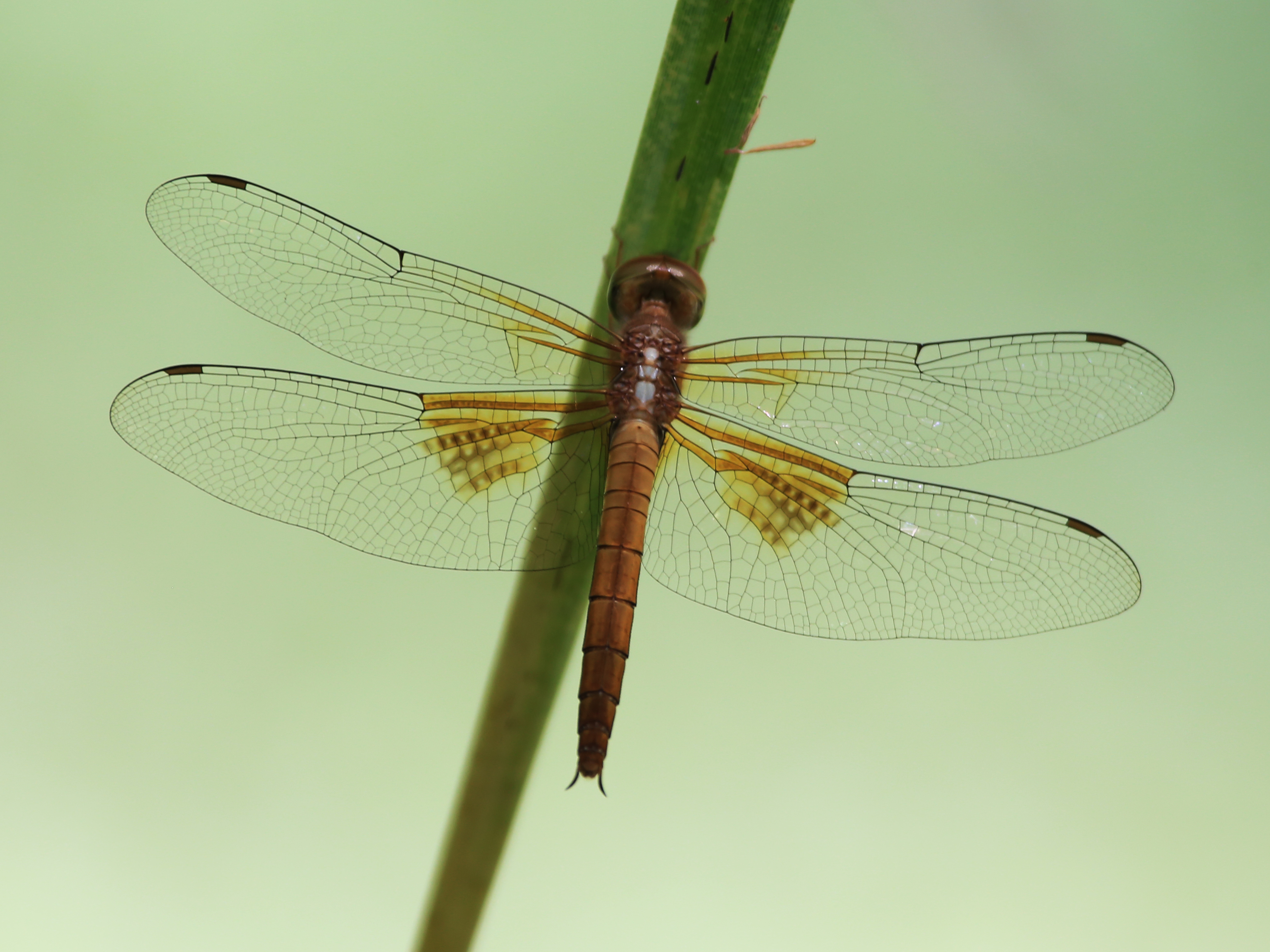
Adult female

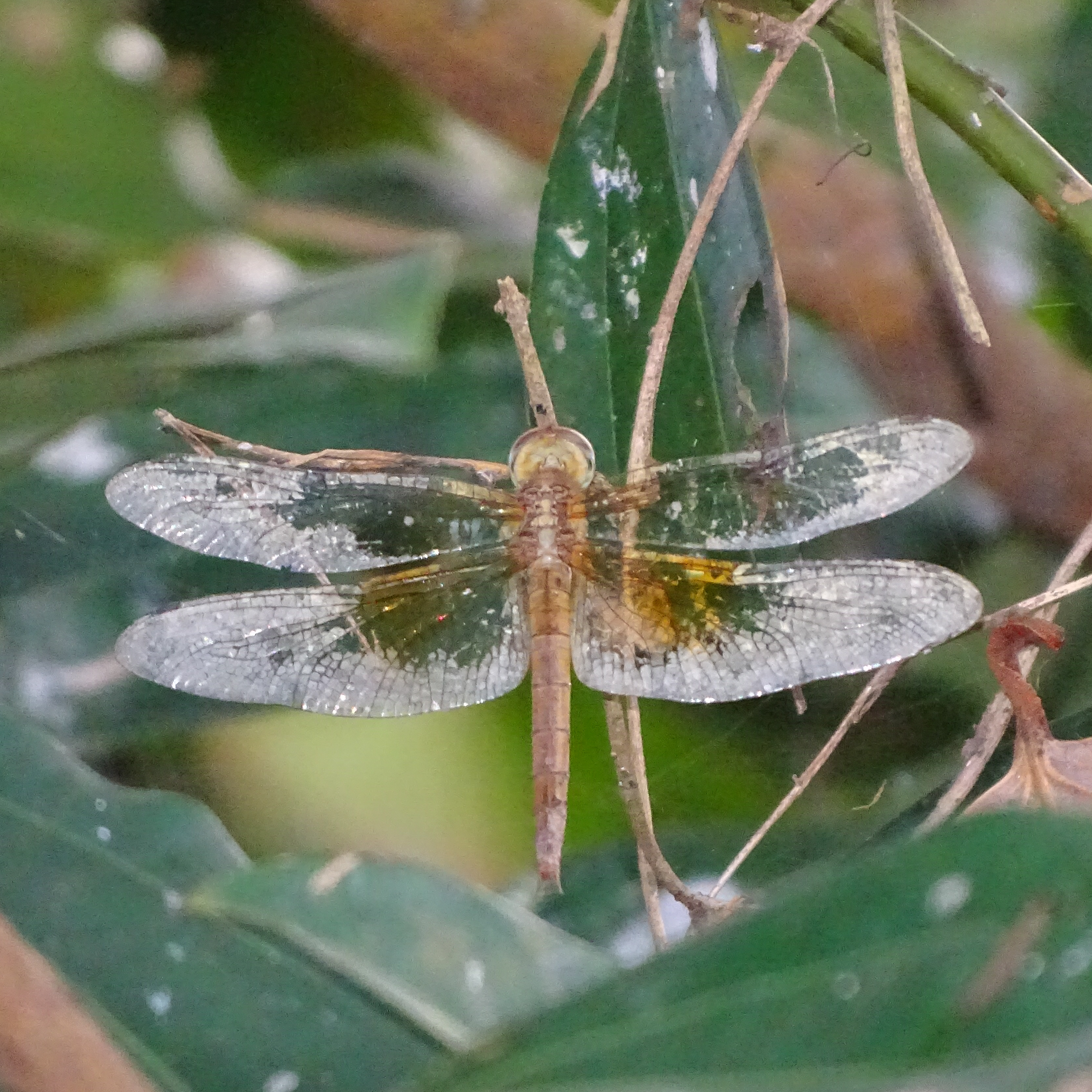
Old female

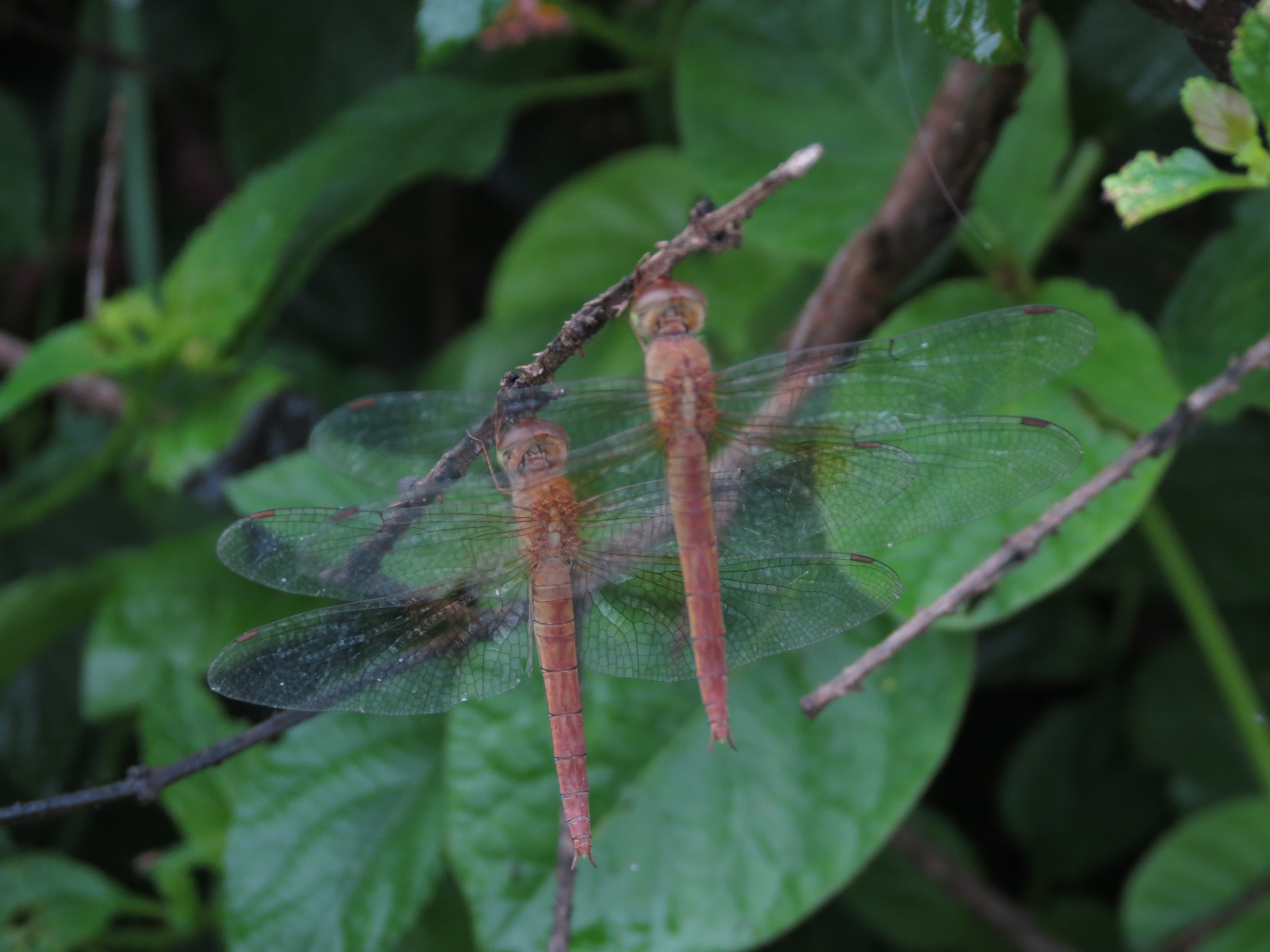
Females without white patches in wings

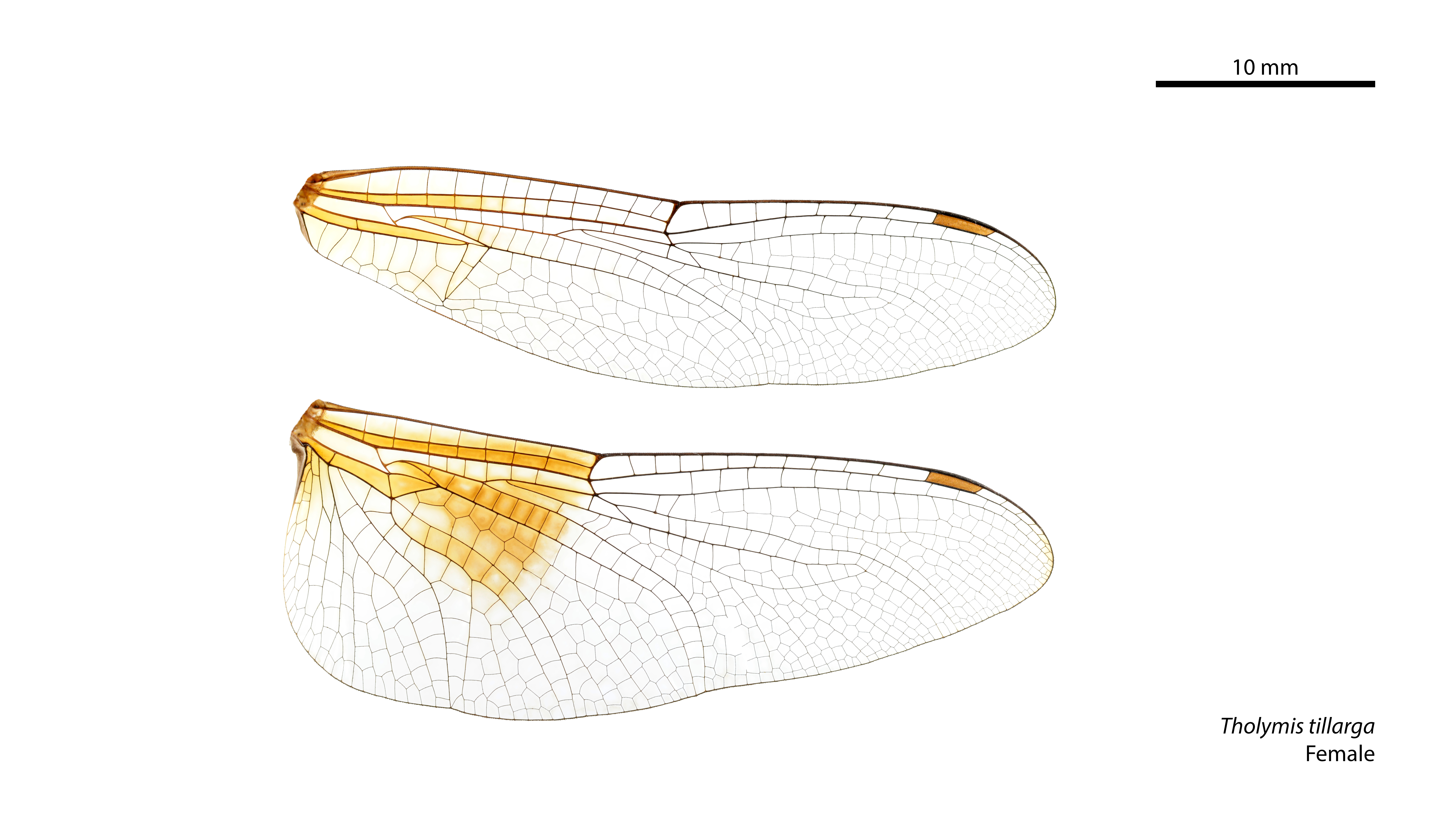
Female wings

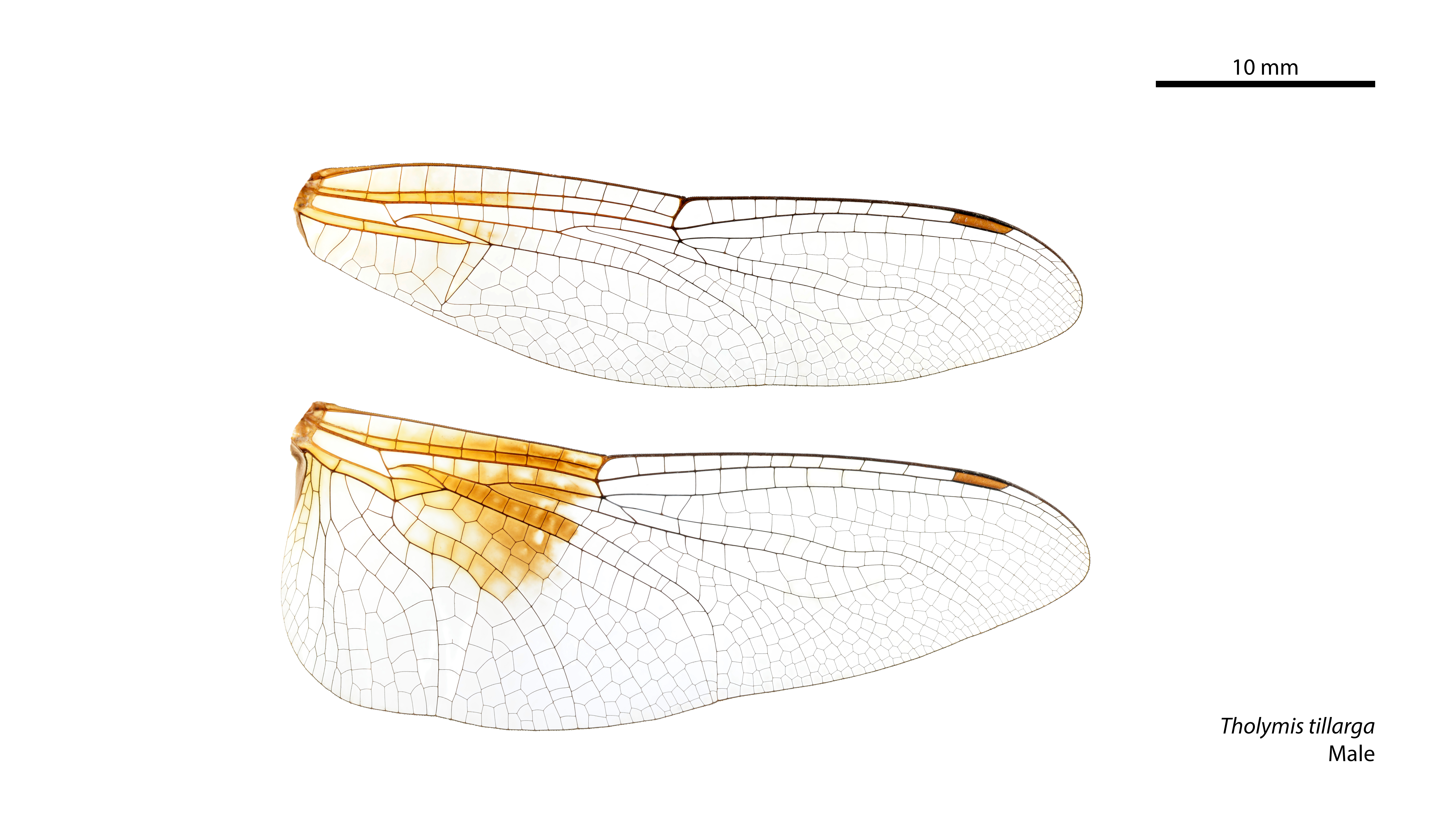
Male wings

== See also ==
- List of odonates of Sri Lanka
- List of odonates of India
- List of odonata of Kerala
- List of Odonata species of Australia
