= Mister Twister =

Mister Twister may refer to:

- Mister Twister (band), a Russian rockabilly band
- Mister Twister (comics), the name of three characters in DC Comics
- Mister Twister, a roller coaster at Elitch Gardens
- "Mister Twister" (poem), a satirical anti-racist poem by Samuel Marshak
- "Mister Twister" (song), Connie Francis song
- Mister Twister, a brand of soft plastic fishing lures
