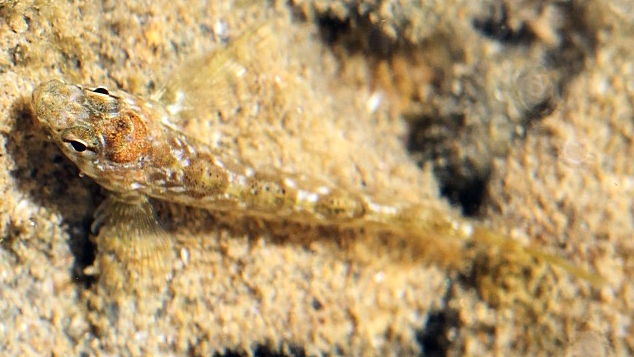

Conservation status
- Least Concern (IUCN 3.1)

Scientific classification
- Kingdom: Animalia
- Phylum: Chordata
- Class: Actinopterygii
- Order: Blenniiformes
- Family: Tripterygiidae
- Genus: Bellapiscis
- Species: B. medius

Binomial name
- Bellapiscis medius (Günther, 1861)

Synonyms
- Tripterygium medium Günther, 1861; Enneapterygius medium (Günther, 1861); Helcogramma medium (Günther, 1861)

= Bellapiscis medius =

Species of fish

Bellapiscis medius, the twister, is a triplefin fish of the family Tripterygiidae, commonly found around the coast of New Zealand. Its length is between 5 and 10 cm.

== Habitat ==
This species is the only triplefin that as an adult lives in intertidal zone habitat. It can be observed in tidal pools and has adapted to survive the changes in temperature, oxygen saturation and levels of water acidity that accompany living in that habitat. The abundance of this fish in tidal pools decreases during the winter months.

== Prey ==
B. medius feeds on small crustaceans including barnacles, molluscs including snails, and amphipods.
