= Aerial twist =

An aerial twist is an acrobatic flip that incorporates a 180° rotation during the peak of the flip's height. Gymnasts normally perform the twisting with the legs together to obtain a faster spin and more aesthetically pleasing execution. Tricksters normally perform the twisting with the legs apart; mainly for style. Many martial arts tricksters first learning this move have a tendency to begin more like a butterfly twist than an aerial. In the tricking community, this move can be done from either a running start, a small hop skip, standing, or from another trick in a combo.

== Variations ==
- Hyperswipe

This variant of the Aerial Twist is executed the same way as an aerial twist, but normally requires extra height and faster/more rotation. The defining difference is that the other leg is thrown out and is used to land on rather than the leg used to take off. Its name is derived from the fact it is a twisting move that lands on the other leg like a hypertwist and that the ending of it looks almost identical to a sideswipe.

- Aerial 720 Twist

This variant is an aerial twist that rotates an additional 360°. Though in actuality, the practitioner only rotates a total of 540°. It is referred to as an aerial 720 twist because a normal twist that adds an additional 360° is referred to as a 720 twist. An Aerial 720 Twist is considered more difficult because of the added rotation, extra speed and height that are required to successfully land this variant. This move is generally referred to as a 'Double Aerial Twist' or 'Double A-twist.'

== See also ==
- Gymnastics
