= Ultra Twister =

Ultra Twister may refer to:

- Ultra Twister (Six Flags), amusement ride at two Six Flags parks in the United States until 2005
- Ultra Twister (Nagashima Spa Land), amusement ride at the Nagashima Spa Land park ain Mie Prefecture, Japan
