= Well-behaved statistic =

Although the term well-behaved statistic often seems to be used in the scientific literature in somewhat the same way as is well-behaved in mathematics (that is, to mean "non-pathological") it can also be assigned precise mathematical meaning, and in more than one way. In the former case, the meaning of this term will vary from context to context. In the latter case, the mathematical conditions can be used to derive classes of combinations of distributions with statistics which are well-behaved in each sense.

First Definition: The variance of a well-behaved statistical estimator is finite and one condition on its mean is that it is differentiable in the parameter being estimated.

Second Definition: The statistic is monotonic, well-defined, and locally sufficient.

== Conditions for a Well-Behaved Statistic: First Definition ==
More formally the conditions can be expressed in this way. $T$ is a statistic for $\theta$ that is a function of the sample, $X_1, \dots, X_n$. For $T$ to be well-behaved we require:

| $$\operatorname{Var}_\theta \left[ T\left( X_1, \dots, X_n \right)  \right] < \infty \quad \forall \quad \theta \in \Theta$$ | Condition 1 |

$\operatorname{E}_\theta \left( T \right)$ differentiable in $\theta \quad \forall \quad \theta \in \Theta$, and the derivative satisfies:

| $$\frac{d}{d\theta} \int { T\left(X_1, \dots, X_n \right) } \prod_{i=1}^n { f\left( x_i |\theta  \right)  } dx_1 \dots dx_n = \int { T\left(X_1, \dots, X_n \right) \left[ \frac {\partial}{\partial\theta} \prod_{i=1}^n { f\left(x_i | \theta \right) } \right] } dx_1 \dots dx_n$$ | Condition 2 |

== Conditions for a Well-Behaved Statistic: Second Definition ==
In order to derive the distribution law of the parameter T, compatible with $\boldsymbol x$, the statistic must obey some technical properties. Namely, a statistic s is said to be well-behaved if it satisfies the following three statements:

1. monotonicity. A uniformly monotone relation exists between s and ? for any fixed seed $\{z_1, \ldots,z_m\}$ – so as to have a unique solution of (1);
2. well-defined. On each observed s the statistic is well defined for every value of ?, i.e. any sample specification $\{x_1,\ldots,x_m\}\in\mathfrak X^m$ such that $\rho(x_1,\ldots,x_m)=s$ has a probability density different from 0 – so as to avoid considering a non-surjective mapping from $\mathfrak X^m$ to $\mathfrak S$, i.e. associating via $s$ to a sample $\{x_1,\ldots,x_m\}$ a ? that could not generate the sample itself;
3. local sufficiency. $\{\breve\theta_1,\ldots, \breve\theta_N\}$ constitutes a true T sample for the observed s, so that the same probability distribution can be attributed to each sampled value. Now, $\breve\theta_j= h^{-1}(s,\breve z_1^j, \ldots,\breve z_m^j)$ is a solution of (1) with the seed $\{\breve z_1^j,\ldots,\breve z_m^j\}$. Since the seeds are equally distributed, the sole caveat comes from their independence or, conversely from their dependence on ? itself. This check can be restricted to seeds involved by s, i.e. this drawback can be avoided by requiring that the distribution of $\{Z_1,\ldots,Z_m|S=s\}$ is independent of ?. An easy way to check this property is by mapping seed specifications into $x_i$s specifications. The mapping of course depends on ?, but the distribution of $\{X_1, \ldots,X_m|S=s\}$ will not depend on ?, if the above seed independence holds – a condition that looks like a local sufficiency of the statistic S.

The remainder of the present article is mainly concerned with the context of data mining procedures applied to statistical inference and, in particular, to the group of computationally intensive procedure that have been called algorithmic inference.

== Algorithmic inference ==
In algorithmic inference, the property of a statistic that is of most relevance is the pivoting step which allows to transference of probability-considerations from the sample distribution to the distribution of the parameters representing the population distribution in such a way that the conclusion of this statistical inference step is compatible with the sample actually observed.

By default, capital letters (such as U, X) will denote random variables and small letters (u, x) their corresponding realizations and with gothic letters (such as $\mathfrak U, \mathfrak X$) the domain where the variable takes specifications. Facing a sample $\boldsymbol x=\{x_1,\ldots,x_m\}$, given a sampling mechanism $(g_\theta,Z)$, with $\theta$ scalar, for the random variable X, we have
$$\boldsymbol x=\{g_\theta(z_1),\ldots,g_\theta(z_m)\}.$$
The sampling mechanism $(g_\theta,\boldsymbol z)$, of the statistic s, as a function ? of $\{x_1,\ldots,x_m\}$ with specifications in $\mathfrak S$ , has an explaining function defined by the master equation:

| $$s=\rho(x_1,\ldots,x_m) = \rho(g_\theta(z_1), \ldots, g_\theta(z_m)) = h(\theta,z_1,\ldots,z_m),$$ | 1 |

for suitable seeds $\boldsymbol z=\{z_1,\ldots,z_m\}$ and parameter ?

=== Example ===
For instance, for both the Bernoulli distribution with parameter p and the exponential distribution with parameter ? the statistic $\sum_{i=1}^m x_i$ is well-behaved. The satisfaction of the above three properties is straightforward when looking at both explaining functions: $g_p(u)=1$ if $u\leq p$, 0 otherwise in the case of the Bernoulli random variable, and $g_\lambda(u) = -\log u/\lambda$ for the Exponential random variable, giving rise to statistics

$$s_p=\sum_{i=1}^m I_{[0,p]}(u_i)$$

and

$$s_\lambda=-\frac{1}{\lambda}\sum_{i=1}^m \log u_i.$$

Vice versa, in the case of X following a continuous uniform distribution on $[0,A]$ the same statistics do not meet the second requirement. For instance, the observed sample $\{c,c/2,c/3\}$ gives $s'_A=11/6c$. But the explaining function of this X is $g_a(u) = u a$. Hence a master equation $s_A = \sum_{i=1}^m u_i a$ would produce with a U sample $\{0.8, 0.8, 0.8\}$ and a solution $\breve a = 0.76 c$. This conflicts with the observed sample since the first observed value should result greater than the right extreme of the X range. The statistic $s_A=\max\{x_1,\ldots,x_m\}$ is well-behaved in this case.

Analogously, for a random variable X following the Pareto distribution with parameters K and A (see Pareto example for more detail of this case),

$$s_1=\sum_{i=1}^m \log x_i$$

and

$$s_2=\min_{i=1,\ldots,m} \{x_i\}$$

can be used as joint statistics for these parameters.

As a general statement that holds under weak conditions, sufficient statistics are well-behaved with respect to the related parameters. The table below gives sufficient / Well-behaved statistics for the parameters of some of the most commonly used probability distributions.

Common distribution laws together with related sufficient and well-behaved statistics.
| Distribution | Definition of density function | Sufficient/Well-behaved statistic |
|---|---|---|
| Uniform discrete | $f(x;n) = \frac{1}{n} I_{\{1,2,\ldots,n\}}(x)$ | $s_n = \max_i x_i$ |
| Bernoulli | $f(x;p)=p^x (1-p)^{1-x} I_{\{0,1\}}(x)$ | $s_P = \sum_{i=1}^m x_i$ |
| Binomial | $f(x;n,p) = \binom{n}{x}p^x (1-p)^{n-x} I_{0,1,\ldots, n}(x)$ | $s_P = \sum_{i=1}^m x_i$ |
| Geometric | $f(x;p)=p(1-p)^x I_{\{0,1,\ldots\}}(x)$ | $s_P = \sum_{i=1}^m x_i$ |
| Poisson | $f(x;\mu) = e^{-\mu x} \frac{\mu^x}{x!} I_{\{0,1,\ldots\}}(x)$ | $s_M = \sum_{i=1}^m x_i$ |
| Uniform continuous | $f(x;a,b) = \frac{1}{b-a} I_{[a,b]}(x)$ | $s_A = \min_i x_i$; $s_B = \max_i x_i$ |
| Negative exponential | $f(x;\lambda) = \lambda e^{-\lambda x} I_{[0,\infty]}(x)$ | $s_\Lambda = \sum_{i=1}^m x_i$ |
| Pareto | $f(x;a, k)= \frac{a}{k}\left(\frac{x}{k}\right)^{-a -1} I_{[k,\infty]}(x)$ | $s_A = \sum_{i=1}^m \log x_i$; $s_K = \min_i x_i$ |
| Gaussian | $f(x,\mu,\sigma)= \frac{1}{\sqrt{2 \pi}\sigma} e^{-(x-\mu)^2/(2\sigma^2)}$ | $s_M = \sum_{i=1}^m x_i$; $s_\Sigma = \sqrt{\sum_{i=1}^m(x_i-\bar x)^2}$ |
| Gamma | $f(x;r,\lambda)= \frac{\lambda^r}{\Gamma(r)} x^{r-1} e^{-\lambda x} I_{[0,\infty]}(x)$ | $s_\Lambda = \sum_{i=1}^m x_i$; $s_K = \prod_{i=1}^m x_i$ |
