= Donsker classes =

Classes of functions

A class of functions is considered a Donsker class if it satisfies Donsker's theorem, a functional generalization of the central limit theorem.

== Definition ==
Let $\mathcal{F}$ be a collection of square integrable functions on a probability space $(\mathcal{X}, \mathcal{A}, P)$. The empirical process $\mathbb{G}_n$ is the stochastic process on the set $\mathcal{F}$ defined by $\mathbb{G}_n(f) = \sqrt{n}(\mathbb{P}_n - P)(f)$ where $\mathbb{P}_n$ is the empirical measure based on an iid sample $X_1, \dots, X_n$ from $P$.

The class of measurable functions $\mathcal{F}$ is called a Donsker class if the empirical process $(\mathbb{G}_n)_{n = 1}^{\infty}$ converges in distribution to a tight Borel measurable element in the space $\ell^{\infty}(\mathcal{F})$.

By the central limit theorem, for every finite set of functions $f_1, f_2, \dots, f_k \in \mathcal{F}$, the random vector $(\mathbb{G}_n(f_1), \mathbb{G}_n(f_2), \dots, \mathbb{G}_n(f_k))$ converges in distribution to a multivariate normal vector as $n \rightarrow \infty$. Thus the class $\mathcal{F}$ is Donsker if and only if the sequence $(\mathbb{G}_n)_{n = 1}^{\infty}$ is asymptotically tight in $\ell^{\infty}(\mathcal{F})$

== Examples and Sufficient Conditions ==
Classes of functions which have finite Dudley's entropy integral are Donsker classes. This includes empirical distribution functions formed from the class of functions defined by $\mathbb I_{(-\infty, t]}$ as well as parametric classes over bounded parameter spaces. More generally any VC class is also Donsker class.

== Properties ==
Classes of functions formed by taking infima or suprema of functions in a Donsker class also form a Donsker class.

== Donsker's Theorem ==
Donsker's theorem states that the empirical distribution function, when properly normalized, converges weakly to a Brownian bridge—a continuous Gaussian process. This is significant as it assures that results analogous to the central limit theorem hold for empirical processes, thereby enabling asymptotic inference for a wide range of statistical applications.

The concept of the Donsker class is influential in the field of asymptotic statistics. Knowing whether a function class is a Donsker class helps in understanding the limiting distribution of empirical processes, which in turn facilitates the construction of confidence bands for function estimators and hypothesis testing.

== See also ==
- Empirical process
- Central limit theorem
- Brownian bridge
- Glivenko–Cantelli theorem
- Vapnik–Chervonenkis theory
- Weak convergence (probability)
