= Uniform convergence in probability =

Notion of convergence of random variables

Uniform convergence in probability is a form of convergence in probability in statistical asymptotic theory and probability theory. It means that, under certain conditions, the empirical frequencies of all events in a certain event-family uniformly converge to their theoretical probabilities. Uniform convergence in probability has applications to statistics as well as machine learning as part of statistical learning theory. Specifically, the Glivenko-Cantelli theorem and the homonymous classes of functions are fundamentally related to uniform convergence.

The law of large numbers says that, for each single event $A$, its empirical frequency in a sequence of independent trials converges (with high probability) to its theoretical probability. In many applications however, the need arises to judge simultaneously the probabilities of events of an entire class $S$ from one and the same sample. Moreover, it, is required that the relative frequency of the events converge to the probability uniformly over the entire class of events $S$. The Uniform Convergence Theorem gives a sufficient condition for this convergence to hold. Roughly, if the event-family is sufficiently simple (its VC dimension is sufficiently small) then uniform convergence holds.

== Definitions ==
For a class of predicates $H$ defined on a set $X$ and a set of samples $x=(x_1,x_2,\dots,x_m)$, where $x_i\in X$, the empirical frequency of $h\in H$ on $x$ is

$$\widehat{Q}_x(h)=\frac 1 m |\{i:1\leq i\leq m, h(x_i)=1\}|.$$

The theoretical probability of $h\in H$ is defined as $Q_P(h) = P\{y\in X : h(y)=1\}.$

The Uniform Convergence Theorem states, roughly, that if $H$ is "simple" and we draw samples independently (with replacement) from $X$ according to any distribution $P$, then with high probability, the empirical frequency will be close to its expected value, which is the theoretical probability.

Here "simple" means that the Vapnik–Chervonenkis dimension of the class $H$ is small relative to the size of the sample. In other words, a sufficiently simple collection of functions behaves roughly the same on a small random sample as it does on the distribution as a whole.

The Uniform Convergence Theorem was first proved by Vapnik and Chervonenkis using the concept of growth function.

== Uniform Convergence Theorem ==
The statement of the Uniform Convergence Theorem is as follows:

If $H$ is a set of $\{0,1\}$-valued functions defined on a set $X$ and $P$ is a probability distribution on $X$ then for $\varepsilon>0$ and $m$ a positive integer, we have:

$$P^m\{|Q_P(h)-\widehat{Q_x}(h)|\geq\varepsilon \text{ for some } h\in H\}\leq 4\Pi_H(2m)e^{-\varepsilon^2 m/8}.$$

In the above, for any $x\in X^m,$$Q_P(h)=P\{(y\in X:h(y)=1\},$$\widehat{Q}_x(h)=\frac 1 m |\{i:1\leq i\leq m,h(x_{i})=1\}|$ and $|x|=m.$ $P^m$ indicates that the probability is taken over $x$ consisting of $m$ i.i.d. draws from the distribution $P.$

Finally, the growth function $\Pi_H$ is defined in the following way, for any $\{0,1\}$-valued functions $H$ over $X$ and for any natural number $m$: $\Pi_H(m)=\max|\{h\cap D: D\subseteq X, |D|=m, h\in H\}|.$

From the point of view of Learning Theory one can consider $H$ to be the Concept/Hypothesis class defined over the instance set $X$. Crucially, the Sauer–Shelah lemma implies that $\Pi_H(m)\leq m^{d}$, where $d$ is the VC dimension of $H$.

== Proof of the Uniform Convergence Theorem ==
and are the sources of the proof below. Before we get into the details of the proof of the Uniform Convergence Theorem we will present a high level overview of the proof.

1. Symmetrization: We transform the problem of analyzing $|Q_{P}(h)-\widehat{Q}_{x}(h)|\geq\varepsilon$ into the problem of analyzing $|\widehat{Q}_{r}(h)-\widehat{Q}_{s}(h)|\geq\varepsilon/2$, where $r$ and $s$ are i.i.d samples of size $m$ drawn according to the distribution $P$. One can view $r$ as the original randomly drawn sample of length $m$, while $s$ may be thought as the testing sample which is used to estimate $Q_{P}(h)$.
2. Permutation: Since $r$ and $s$ are picked identically and independently, so swapping elements between them will not change the probability distribution on $r$ and $s$. So, we will try to bound the probability of $|\widehat{Q}_{r}(h)-\widehat{Q}_{s}(h)|\geq\varepsilon/2$ for some $h \in H$ by considering the effect of a specific collection of permutations of the joint sample $x=r||s$. Specifically, we consider permutations $\sigma(x)$ which swap $x_i$ and $x_{m+i}$ in some subset of ${1,2,...,m}$. The symbol $r||s$ means the concatenation of $r$ and $s$.
3. Reduction to a finite class: We can now restrict the function class $H$ to a fixed joint sample and hence, if $H$ has finite VC Dimension, it reduces to the problem to one involving a finite function class.

We present the technical details of the proof. It should be stressed that this proof glosses over details like the measurability of the events $V$ and $R$; measurability is granted in the case of $H$ being finite or countable, but this is not normally the case in standard applications of the theorem (e.g. for statistical learning theory or to prove the Glivenko-Cantelli theorem). To get measurability, one needs to use a notion of separability of the underlying space, possibly related to $H$.

=== Symmetrization ===
Lemma: Let $V=\{x\in X^m:|Q_P(h)-\widehat{Q}_x(h)|\geq\varepsilon \text{ for some } h\in H\}$ and

$$R=\{(r,s)\in X^m \times X^m:|\widehat{Q_r}(h)-\widehat{Q}_s(h) |\geq \varepsilon /2 \text{ for some } h\in H\}.$$

Then for $m\geq\frac 2 {\varepsilon^2}$, $P^m(V)\leq 2P^{2m}(R)$.

Proof: By the triangle inequality,
if $|Q_{P}(h)-\widehat{Q}_r(h)|\geq\varepsilon$ and $|Q_P(h)-\widehat{Q}_s (h)|\leq\varepsilon /2$ then $|\widehat{Q}_r(h)-\widehat{Q}_s (h)|\geq\varepsilon /2$.

Therefore,

$$\begin{align}
& P^{2m}(R) \\[5pt]
\geq {} & P^{2m}\{\exists h\in H,|Q_{P}(h)-\widehat{Q}_r(h)| \geq \varepsilon \text{ and } |Q_P(h)-\widehat{Q}_s(h)|\leq\varepsilon /2\} \\[5pt]
= {} & \int_V P^m\{s:\exists h\in H,|Q_P(h)-\widehat{Q}_r(h)|\geq\varepsilon \text{ and } |Q_P(h)-\widehat{Q}_s(h)|\leq\varepsilon /2\} \, dP^m(r) \\[5pt]
= {} & A
\end{align}$$

since $r$ and $s$ are independent.

Now for $r\in V$ fix an $h\in H$ such that $|Q_P(h)-\widehat{Q}_r(h)|\geq\varepsilon$. For this $h$, we shall show that

$$P^m \left\{ |Q_P(h)-\widehat{Q}_s(h)|\leq\frac \varepsilon 2\right\} \geq\frac 1 2.$$

Thus for any $r\in V$, $A\geq\frac{P^m(V)}2$ and hence $P^{2m}(R)\geq\frac{P^m(V)}2$. And hence we perform the first step of our high level idea.

Notice, $m\cdot \widehat{Q}_s(h)$ is a binomial random variable with expectation $m\cdot Q_{P}(h)$ and variance $m\cdot Q_P(h)(1-Q_P(h))$. By Chebyshev's inequality we get

$$P^m \left\{|Q_P(h)-\widehat{Q_s(h)}| > \frac \varepsilon 2\right\} \leq \frac{m\cdot Q_P(h)(1-Q_P(h))}{(\varepsilon m/2)^2} \leq \frac 1 {\varepsilon^2 m} \leq\frac 1 2$$

for the mentioned bound on $m$. Here we use the fact that $x(1-x)\leq 1/4$ for $x$.

=== Permutations ===
Let $\Gamma_{m}$ be the set of all permutations of $\{1,2,3,\dots,2m\}$ that swaps $i$ and $m+i$ $\forall i$ in some subset of $\{1,2,3,\ldots,2m\}$.

Lemma: Let $R$ be any subset of $X^{2m}$ and $P$ any probability distribution on $X$. Then,

$$P^{2m}(R)=E[\Pr[\sigma(x)\in R]]\leq \max_{x\in X^{2m}}(\Pr[\sigma(x)\in R]),$$

where the expectation is over $x$ chosen according to $P^{2m}$, and the probability is over $\sigma$ chosen uniformly from $\Gamma_{m}$.

Proof: For any $\sigma\in\Gamma_m,$

$$P^{2m}(R) = P^{2m}\{x:\sigma(x)\in R\}$$

(since coordinate permutations preserve the product distribution $P^{2m}$.)

$$\begin{align}
\therefore P^{2m}(R) = {} & \int_{X^{2m}}1_{R}(x) \, dP^{2m}(x) \\[5pt]
= {} & \frac{1}{|\Gamma_{m}|}\sum_{\sigma\in\Gamma_m} \int_{X^{2m}} 1_R(\sigma(x)) \, dP^{2m}(x) \\[5pt]
= {} & \int_{X^{2m}} \frac 1 {|\Gamma_m|}\sum_{\sigma\in\Gamma_m} 1_R (\sigma(x)) \, dP^{2m}(x) \\[5pt]
& \text{(because } |\Gamma_{m}| \text{ is finite)} \\[5pt]
= {} & \int_{X^{2m}} \Pr[\sigma(x)\in R] \, dP^{2m}(x) \quad \text{(the expectation)} \\[5pt]
\leq {} & \max_{x\in X^{2m}}(\Pr[\sigma(x)\in R]).
\end{align}$$

The maximum is guaranteed to exist since there is only a finite set of values that probability under a random permutation can take.

=== Reduction to a finite class ===
Lemma: Basing on the previous lemma,

$$\max_{x\in X^{2m}}(\Pr[\sigma(x)\in R])\leq 4\Pi_H(2m)e^{-\varepsilon^2 m/8}$$.

Proof: Let us define $x=(x_1,x_2,\ldots,x_{2m})$ and $t=|H|_x|$ which is at most $\Pi_H(2m)$. This means there are functions $h_1,h_2,\ldots,h_t\in H$ such that for any $h\in H,\exists i$ between $1$ and $t$ with $h_i(x_k)=h(x_k)$ for $1\leq k\leq 2m.$

We see that $\sigma(x)\in R$ iff for some $h$ in $H$ satisfies, $|\frac{1}{m}|\{1\leq i\leq m:h(x_{\sigma_{i}})=1\}|-\frac{1}{m}|\{m+1\leq i\leq 2m:h(x_{\sigma_{i}})=1\}||\geq\frac{\varepsilon}{2}$. Hence if we define $w^{j}_{i}=1$ if $h_{j}(x_{i})=1$ and $w^{j}_{i}=0$ otherwise.

For $1\leq i\leq m$ and $1\leq j\leq t$, we have that $\sigma(x)\in R$ iff for some $j$ in ${1,\ldots,t}$ satisfies $|\frac 1 m \left(\sum_i w^j_{\sigma(i)}-\sum_i w^j_{\sigma(m+i)}\right)|\geq\frac \varepsilon 2$. By union bound we get

$$\Pr[\sigma(x)\in R]\leq t\cdot \max\left(\Pr[|\frac 1 m \left(\sum_i w^j_{\sigma_i} - \sum_i w^j_{\sigma_{m+i}}\right)| \geq \frac \varepsilon 2]\right)$$

$$\leq \Pi_{H}(2m)\cdot \max\left(\Pr\left[ \left| \frac 1 m \left(\sum_i w^j_{\sigma_i}-\sum_i w^j_{\sigma_{m+i}}\right)\right| \geq \frac \varepsilon 2 \right] \right).$$

Since, the distribution over the permutations $\sigma$ is uniform for each $i$, so $w^j_{\sigma_i}-w^j_{\sigma_{m+i}}$ equals $\pm |w^j_i-w^j_{m+i}|$, with equal probability.

Thus,

$$\Pr\left[\left|\frac 1 m \left(\sum_i \left(w^j_{\sigma_i}-w^j_{\sigma_{m+i}}\right)\right)\right|\geq\frac \varepsilon 2\right] = \Pr\left[ \left| \frac 1 m \left( \sum_i|w^j_i-w^j_{m+i}|\beta_i\right)\right|\geq\frac \varepsilon 2\right],$$

where the probability on the right is over $\beta_{i}$ and both the possibilities are equally likely. By Hoeffding's inequality, this is at most $2e^{-m\varepsilon^2/8}$.

Finally, combining all the three parts of the proof we get the Uniform Convergence Theorem.
