= Glivenko's theorem =

Glivenko's theorem may refer to:

- Glivenko's theorem (probability theory)
- Glivenko's theorem or Glivenko's translation, a double-negation translation for propositional logic

== See also ==
- Glivenko–Cantelli theorem
- Glivenko–Stone theorem
