= Razauskas =

- Lithuanian surname
- m.: Razauskas
- f.: (unmarried): Razauskaitė
- f.: (married): Razauskienė
- Related names: Rozowski, Rozovsky

Razauskas is a Lithuanian surname Notable people with the surname include:

- Algirdas Ražauskas, Lithuanian politician
- Dainius Razauskas
