= Valery Glivenko =

Soviet mathematician

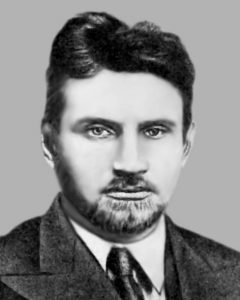
- Glivenko circa 1916
- Born: December 21, 1896; Kyiv, Kiev Governorate, Russian Empire
- Died: February 15, 1940; Moscow, Soviet Union
- Education: Moscow State University (1925)
- Scientific career
- Academic advisors: Nikolai Luzin

Valery Ivanovich Glivenko (Russian: Вале́рий Ива́нович Гливе́нко, Ukrainian: Валерій Іванович Гливенко; 2 January 1897 (Gregorian calendar) / 21 December 1896 (Julian calendar) in Kyiv – 15 February 1940 in Moscow) was a Ukrainian-soviet mathematician. He worked in the foundations of mathematics, real analysis, probability theory, and mathematical statistics. He taught at the Moscow Industrial Pedagogical Institute until his death at age 43. Most of Glivenko's work was published in French.

== See also ==
- Glivenko's double-negation translation
- Glivenko's theorem (probability theory)
- Glivenko–Cantelli theorem
- Glivenko–Stone theorem

== Works ==
- Glivenko V. (1929). "Sur quelques points de la logique de M. Brouwer". Bulletins de la Classe des Sciences (in French). 15 (5): 183–188.
- Glivenko V. (1928). "Sur la logique de M. Brouwer". Académie Royale de Belgique, Bulletin (in French). 14: 225–228.
- Glivenko V. (1928). "Sur les valeurs probables de fonctions". Rendiconti Accad. D. L. Roma (in French). 8 (6): 480–483.
- Glivenko V. (1929). "Sur les fonctions représentables implicitement par fonctions continues". Fundamenta Mathematicae (in French). 14 (1): 252–265. doi:10.4064/fm-14-1-252-265.
- Glivenko V. (1929). "Sur les fonctions implicites". Mat. Sb. (in French). 36 (2): 138–142.
- Glivenko V. (1933). "Sulla determinazione empirica delle leggi di probabilita". Giorn. Ist. Ital. Attuari (in Italian). 4: 92–99.
- Glivenko V. (1937). "Contribution a l'étude des systémes de choses normées". American Journal of Mathematics (in French). 59 (3): 941–956. doi:10.2307/2371360. JSTOR 2371360.
- Glivenko, V. (1938). Théorie générale des Structures (in French). Vol. 652. Hermann et Cie.
