= Shattered set =

Notion in computational learning

A class of sets is said to shatter another set if it is possible to "pick out" any element of that set using intersection. The concept of shattered sets plays an important role in Vapnik–Chervonenkis theory, also known as VC-theory. Shattering and VC-theory are used in the study of empirical processes as well as in statistical computational learning theory.

== Definition ==
Suppose A is a set and C is a class of sets. The class C shatters the set A if for each subset a of A, there is some element c of C such that

$$a = c \cap A.$$

Equivalently, C shatters A when their intersection is equal to A's power set: P(A) = { c ∩ A | c ∈ C }.

We employ the letter C to refer to a "class" or "collection" of sets, as in a Vapnik–Chervonenkis class (VC-class). The set A is often assumed to be finite because, in empirical processes, we are interested in the shattering of finite sets of data points.

== Example ==
We will show that the class of all discs in the plane (two-dimensional space) does not shatter every set of four points on the unit circle, yet the class of all convex sets in the plane does shatter every finite set of points on the unit circle.

Let A be a set of four points on the unit circle and let C be the class of all discs.

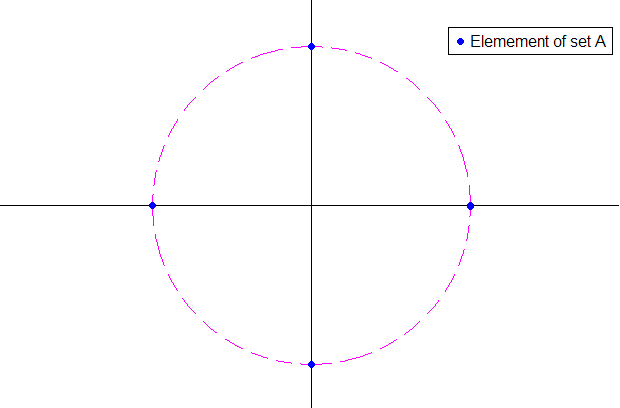
The set A of four particular points on the unit circle (the unit circle is shown in purple).

To test where C shatters A, we attempt to draw a disc around every subset of points in A. First, we draw a disc around the subsets of each isolated point. Next, we try to draw a disc around every subset of point pairs. This turns out to be doable for adjacent points, but impossible for points on opposite sides of the circle. Any attempt to include those points on the opposite side will necessarily include other points not in that pair. Hence, any pair of opposite points cannot be isolated out of A using intersections with class C and so C does not shatter A.

As visualized below:

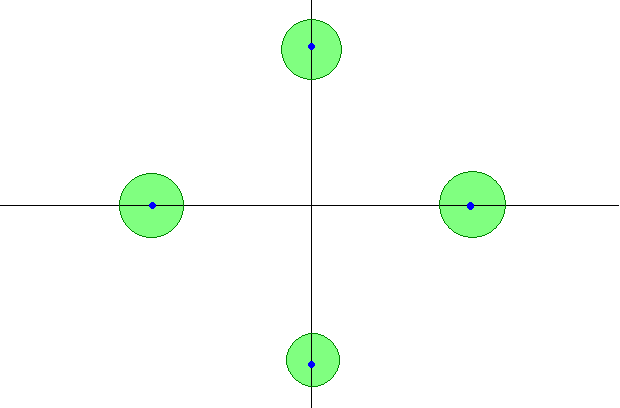
Each individual point can be isolated with a disc (showing all four).

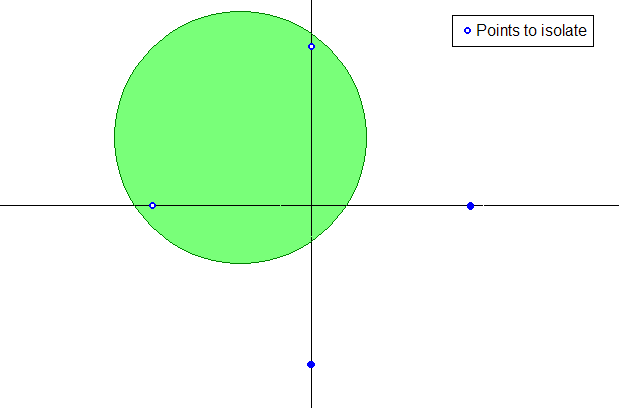
Each subset of adjacent points can be isolated with a disc (showing one of four).

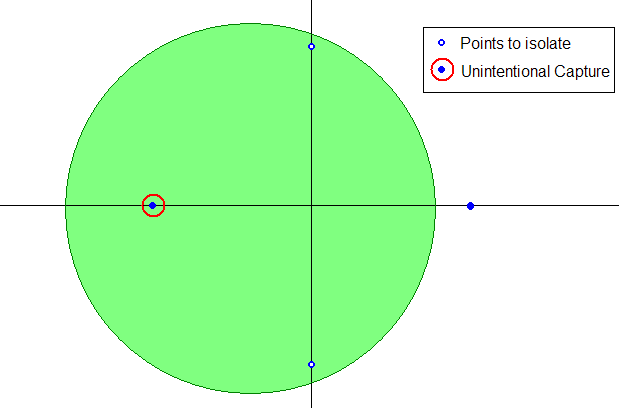
A subset of points on opposite sides of the unit circle can not be isolated with a disc.

Because there is some subset which can not be isolated by any disc in C, we conclude then that A is not shattered by C. And, with a bit of thought, we can prove that no set of four points is shattered by this C.

However, if we redefine C to be the class of all elliptical discs, we find that we can still isolate all the subsets from above, as well as the points that were formerly problematic. Thus, this specific set of 4 points is shattered by the class of elliptical discs. Visualized below:

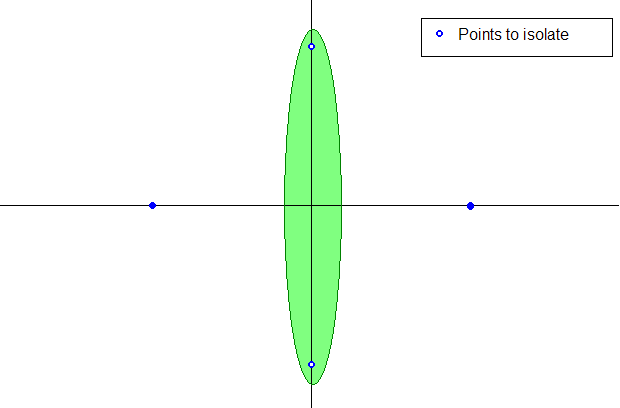
Opposite points of A are now separable by some ellipse (showing one of two)

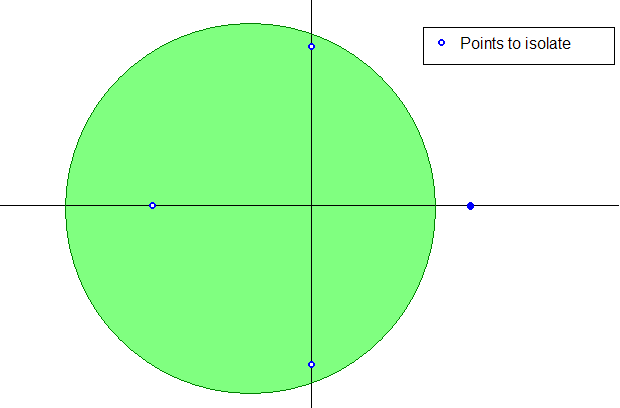
Each subset of three points in A is also separable by some ellipse (showing one of four)

With a bit of thought, we could generalize that any set of finite points on a unit circle could be shattered by the class of all convex sets (visualize connecting the dots).

== Shatter coefficient ==
To quantify the richness of a collection C of sets, we use the concept of shattering coefficients (also known as the growth function). For a collection C of sets $s \subset \Omega$, $\Omega$ being any space, often a sample space, we define the n^{th} shattering coefficient of C as

$$S_C(n) = \max_{\forall x_1,x_2,\dots,x_n \in \Omega } \operatorname{card} \{\,\{\,x_1,x_2,\dots,x_n\}\cap s, s\in  C \}$$

where $\operatorname{card}$ denotes the cardinality of the set and $x_1,x_2,\dots,x_n \in \Omega$ is any set of n points,.

$S_C(n)$ is the largest number of subsets of any set A of n points that can be formed by intersecting A with the sets in collection C.

For example, if set A contains 3 points, its power set, $P(A)$, contains $2^3=8$ elements. If C shatters A, its shattering coefficient(3) would be 8 and $S_C(2)$ would be $2^2=4$. However, if one of those sets in $P(A)$ cannot be obtained through intersections in c, then $S_C(3)$ would only be 7. If none of those sets can be obtained, $S_C(3)$ would be 0. Additionally, if $S_C(2)=3$, for example, then there is an element in the set of all 2-point sets from A that cannot be obtained from intersections with C. It follows from this that $S_C(3)$ would also be less than 8 (i.e. C would not shatter A) because we have already located a "missing" set in the smaller power set of 2-point sets.

This example illustrates some properties of $S_C(n)$:

1. $S_C(n)\leq 2^n$ for all n because $\{s\cap A|s\in C\}\subseteq P(A)$ for any $A\subseteq \Omega$.
2. If $S_C(n)=2^n$, that means there is a set of cardinality n, which can be shattered by C.
3. If $S_C(N)<2^N$ for some $N>1$ then $S_C(n)<2^n$ for all $n\geq N$.

The third property means that if C cannot shatter any set of cardinality N then it can not shatter sets of larger cardinalities.

== Vapnik–Chervonenkis class ==
If A cannot be shattered by C, there will be a smallest value of n that makes the shatter coefficient(n) less than $2^n$ because as n gets larger, there are more sets that could be missed. Alternatively, there is also a largest value of n for which the $S_C(n)$ is still $2^n$, because as n gets smaller, there are fewer sets that could be omitted. The extreme of this is $S_C(0)$ (the shattering coefficient of the empty set), which must always be $2^0=1$. These statements lends themselves to defining the VC dimension of a class C as:

$$VC(C)=\underset{n}{\min}\{n:S_C(n)<2^n\}\,$$

or, alternatively, as

$$VC_0(C)=\underset{n}{\max}\{n:S_C(n)=2^n\}.\,$$

Note that $VC(C)=VC_0(C)+1.$. The VC dimension is usually defined as $VC_0$, the largest cardinality of points chosen that will still shatter A (i.e. n such that $S_C(n)=2^n$).

Alternatively, if for any n there is a set of cardinality n which can be shattered by C, then $S_C(n)=2^n$ for all n and the VC dimension of this class C is infinite.

A class with finite VC dimension is called a Vapnik–Chervonenkis class or VC class. A class C is uniformly Glivenko–Cantelli if and only if it is a VC class.

== See also ==
- Sauer–Shelah lemma, relating the cardinality of a family of sets to the size of its largest shattered set
