= Ε-net =

An $\varepsilon$-net or epsilon net in mathematics may refer to:

- ε-net (computational geometry) in computational geometry and in geometric probability theory
- ε-net (metric spaces) in metric spaces
