= Natarajan (name) =

Natarajan is a given name and surname. Notable persons with that name include:

== People with the given name ==
- Natarajan Chandrasekaran (born 1963), Indian business executive
- Natarajan Subramaniam (born 1971), Indian cinematographer and actor

== People with the middle name ==
- Conjeevaram Natarajan Annadurai (1909–1969), Indian politician

== People with the surname ==
- A. Natarajan, Indian politician
- Jayanthi Natarajan (born 1954), Indian lawyer and politician
- Kalyani Natarajan, Indian actress
- Kumaravadivel Natarajan
- Meenakshi Natarajan (born 1973), Indian politician
- Navya Natarajan, Indian actress
- P. R. Natarajan (born 1950), Indian politician
- Priyamvada Natarajan, Indian theoretical astrophysicis
- Pyramid Natarajan (born 1944), Indian actor and film producer
- S. Natarajan, Indian politician
- Sanchana Natarajan, Indian model and actress
- Sasikala Natarajan (born 1954), Indian politician
- Sri Natarajan (born 1987), Indian actor
- T. Natarajan (born 1991), Indian cricketer
- Vellamandi N. Natarajan, Indian politician

== See also ==
- Natarajan, a depiction of Shiva, one of the main deities in Hinduism
- Natarajan dimension
