= Boris Rozovsky =

Russian-American mathematician

- Born: 8 June 1945 (age 81); Odessa, Russian SFSR
- Citizenship: Russian
- Education: Moscow State University
- Awards: Peter-the-Great Medal; Kolmogorov Medal
- Scientific career
- Fields: Mathematics
- Workplaces: Brown University
- Doctoral advisor: Eugene Dynkin

Boris Rozovsky is Ford Foundation Professor of Applied Mathematics at Brown University. His research is in stochastic analysis, particularly the study of stochastic partial differential equations.

Rozovsky started his studies in art school, but switched to mathematics; he earned a master's degree in 1968 and a Ph.D. in 1973 from Moscow State University. He moved to the U.S. in 1988; after teaching for fourteen years at the University of Southern California, he joined the Brown University faculty in 2006.

Since 1997, he is a Fellow of the Institute of Mathematical Statistics.

In 1997, he was awarded the Peter-the-Great Medal.

In 2003 he was awarded the Kolmogorov Medal.
