= Rozovsky =

Rozovsky (Russian: Розовский) is a masculine surname of Jewish origin, its feminine counterpart is Rozovskaya. It may refer to

- Boris Rozovsky (born 1945), American applied mathematician
- Eduard Rozovsky (1926–2011), Russian cinematographer and cameraman
- Shmuel Rozovsky (1913–1979), Talmudic lecturer in Israel
