= Dudley's entropy integral =

Dudley's entropy integral is a mathematical concept in the field of probability theory that describes a relationship involving the entropy of certain metric spaces and the concentration of measure phenomenon. It is named after the mathematician R. M. Dudley, who introduced the integral as part of his work on the uniform central limit theorem.

== Definition ==
The Dudley's entropy integral is defined for a metric space $(T, d)$ equipped with a probability measure $\mu$. Given a set $T$ and an $\epsilon$-covering, the entropy of $T$ is the logarithm of the minimum number of balls of radius $\epsilon$ required to cover $T$. Dudley's entropy integral is then given by the formula:

$\int_0^\infty \sqrt{\log N(T, d, \epsilon)} \, d\epsilon$

where $N(T, d, \epsilon)$ is the covering number, i.e. the minimum number of balls of radius $\epsilon$ with respect to the metric $d$ that cover the space $T$.

== Mathematical background ==
Dudley's entropy integral arises in the context of empirical processes and Gaussian processes, where it is used to bound the supremum of a stochastic process. Its significance lies in providing a metric entropy measure to assess the complexity of a space with respect to a given probability distribution. More specifically, the expected supremum of a sub-gaussian process is bounded up to finite constants by the entropy integral. Additionally, function classes with a finite entropy integral satisfy a uniform central limit theorem.

== See also ==
- Entropy (information theory)
- Covering number
- Donsker's theorem
