= Vladimir Vapnik =

Russian mathematician

Vladimir N. Vapnik
- Born: December 6, 1936 (age 89); Tashkent, Uzbek SSR
- Education: Institute of Control Sciences, Russian Academy of Sciences; Uzbek State University
- Known for: Vapnik–Chervonenkis theory Vapnik–Chervonenkis dimension Support-vector machine Support-vector clustering algorithm Statistical learning theory Structural risk minimization
- Awards: Kolmogorov Medal (2018); IEEE John von Neumann Medal (2017); Kampé de Fériet Award (2014); C&C Prize (2013); Benjamin Franklin Medal (2012); IEEE Frank Rosenblatt Award (2012); IEEE Neural Networks Pioneer Award (2010); Paris Kanellakis Award (2008); Fellow of the U.S. National Academy of Engineering (2006); Gabor Award, International Neural Network Society (2005); Alexander Humboldt Research Award (2003)
- Scientific career
- Fields: Machine learning Statistics
- Workplaces: Facebook Artificial Intelligence Research; Vencore Labs; NEC Laboratories America; Adaptive Systems Research Department, AT&T Bell Laboratories; Royal Holloway, University of London; Columbia University
- Doctoral advisor: Alexander Lerner

Vladimir Naumovich Vapnik (Russian: Владимир Наумович Вапник; born 6 December 1936) is a statistician, researcher, and academic. He is one of the main developers of the Vapnik–Chervonenkis theory of statistical learning and the co-inventor of the support-vector machine method and support-vector clustering algorithms.

== Early life and education ==
Vladimir Vapnik was born to a Jewish family in the Soviet Union. He received his master's degree in mathematics from the Uzbek State University, Samarkand, Uzbek SSR in 1958 and Ph.D in statistics at the Institute of Control Sciences, Moscow in 1964. He worked at this institute from 1961 to 1990 and became Head of the Computer Science Research Department.

== Academic career ==
At the end of 1990, Vladimir Vapnik moved to the USA and joined the Adaptive Systems Research Department at AT&T Bell Labs in Holmdel, New Jersey. While at AT&T, Vapnik and his colleagues did work on the support-vector machine (SVM), which he also worked on much earlier before moving to the USA. They demonstrated its performance on a number of problems of interest to the machine learning community, including handwriting recognition. The group later became the Image Processing Research Department of AT&T Laboratories when AT&T spun off Lucent Technologies in 1996. In 2001, Asa Ben-Hur, David Horn, Hava Siegelmann and Vapnik developed Support-Vector Clustering, which enabled the algorithm to categorize inputs without labels—becoming one of the most ubiquitous data clustering applications in use. Vapnik left AT&T in 2002 and joined NEC Laboratories in Princeton, New Jersey, where he worked in the Machine Learning group. He also holds a Professor of Computer Science and Statistics position at Royal Holloway, University of London since 1995, as well as a position as Professor of Computer Science at Columbia University, New York City since 2003. As of February 1, 2021, he has an h-index of 86 and, overall, his publications have been cited 226597 times. His book on "The Nature of Statistical Learning Theory" alone has been cited around 113000 times.

On November 25, 2014, Vapnik joined Facebook Artificial Intelligence Research (now Meta AI), where he is working alongside his longtime collaborators Jason Weston, Léon Bottou, Ronan Collobert, and Yann LeCun. In 2016, he also joined Peraton Labs.

== Honors and awards ==
Vladimir Vapnik was inducted into the U.S. National Academy of Engineering in 2006. He received the 2005 Gabor Award from the International Neural Network Society, the 2008 Paris Kanellakis Award, the 2010 Neural Networks Pioneer Award, the 2012 IEEE Frank Rosenblatt Award, the 2012 Benjamin Franklin Medal in Computer and Cognitive Science from the Franklin Institute, the 2013 C&C Prize from the NEC C&C Foundation, the 2014 Kampé de Fériet Award, the 2017 IEEE John von Neumann Medal. In 2018, he received the Kolmogorov Medal from University of London and delivered the Kolmogorov Lecture. In 2019, Vladimir Vapnik received BBVA Foundation Frontiers of Knowledge Award.

== Selected publications ==
- On the uniform convergence of relative frequencies of events to their probabilities, co-author A. Y. Chervonenkis, 1971
- Necessary and sufficient conditions for the uniform convergence of means to their expectations, co-author A. Y. Chervonenkis, 1981
- Estimation of Dependences Based on Empirical Data, 1982
- The Nature of Statistical Learning Theory, 1995
- Statistical Learning Theory (1998). Wiley-Interscience, ISBN 0-471-03003-1.
- Estimation of Dependences Based on Empirical Data, Reprint 2006 (Springer), also contains a philosophical essay on Empirical Inference Science, 2006

== See also ==
- Alexey Chervonenkis
