= Kolmogorov Medal =

- Awarded for: Life-long contributions to one of the fields initiated by Kolmogorov
- First award: 2003
- Website: kolmogorov.cml.rhul.ac.uk

The Kolmogorov Medal is a prize awarded to distinguished researchers with life-long contributions to one of the fields initiated by Andrey Kolmogorov.

The Kolmogorov Medal was first awarded in 2003 to celebrate 100 years since the birth of Kolmogorov. The recipient is invited to deliver a lecture at the Centre for Reliable Machine Learning of Royal Holloway, University of London. Early lectures were published in The Computer Journal.

== Recipients ==
The following people have received the Kolmogorov Medal:

Year	Name	Lecture
2003	Ray Solomonoff	The Universal Distribution and Machine Learning
2004	Leonid Levin	Aperiodic Tilings: Breaking Translational Symmetry
2005	Per Martin-Löf	100 years of Zermelo's axiom of choice: what was the problem with it?
2006	Jorma Rissanen	The Structure Function and Distinguishable Models of Data
2007	Yakov Sinai	Renormalization Group Method in Probability Theory and Theory of Dynamical Systems
2010	Robert C. Merton	Observations on the Science of Finance in the Practice of Finance: Past, Present, and Future
2018	Vladimir Vapnik	Rethinking Statistical Learning Theory: Learning Using Statistical Invariants

== See also ==
- List of mathematics awards
