= Natarajan dimension =

In the theory of Probably Approximately Correct Machine Learning, the Natarajan dimension characterizes the complexity of learning a set of functions, generalizing from the Vapnik–Chervonenkis dimension for boolean functions to multi-class functions. Originally introduced as the Generalized Dimension by Natarajan, it was subsequently renamed the Natarajan Dimension by Haussler and Long.

== Definition ==
Let $H$ be a set of functions from a set $X$ to a set $Y$. $H$ shatters a set $C \subset X$ if there exist two functions $f_0, f_1 \in H$ such that

- For every $x \in C, f_0(x) \neq f_1(x)$.
- For every $B\subset C$, there exists a function $h \in H$ such that

for all $x \in B, h(x) = f_0(x)$ and for all $x \in C - B, h(x) = f_1(x)$.

The Natarajan dimension of H is the maximal cardinality of a set shattered by $H$.

It is easy to see that if $|Y| = 2$, the Natarajan dimension collapses to the Vapnik–Chervonenkis dimension.

Shalev-Shwartz and Ben-David present comprehensive material on multi-class learning and the Natarajan dimension, including uniform convergence and learnability. Recently, Cohen et al showed that the Natarajan dimension is the dominant term governing agnostic multi-class PAC learnability.
