= Glivenko's theorem (probability theory) =

In probability theory, Glivenko's theorem states that if $\varphi_n, n\in \mathbb N$, $\varphi$ are the characteristic functions of some probability distributions $\mu_n, \mu$ respectively and $\varphi_n \to \varphi$ almost everywhere, then $\mu_n \to \mu$ in the sense of probability distributions.
