= Ε-net (computational geometry) =

In computational geometry, an ε-net (pronounced epsilon-net) is the approximation of a general set by a collection of simpler subsets. In probability theory it is the approximation of one probability distribution by another.

== Background ==
An ε-net with ε = 1/4 of the unit square in the range space where the ranges are closed filled rectangles.

Let X be a set and R be a set of subsets of X; such a pair is called a range space or hypergraph, and the elements of R are called ranges or hyperedges. An ε-net of a subset P of X is a subset N of P such that any range r ∈ R with |r ∩ P| ≥ ε|P| intersects N. In other words, any range that intersects at least a proportion ε of the elements of P must also intersect the ε-net N.

For example, suppose X is the set of points in the two-dimensional plane, R is the set of closed filled rectangles (products of closed intervals), and P is the unit square [0, 1] × [0, 1]. Then the set N consisting of the 8 points shown in the adjacent diagram is a 1/4-net of P, because any closed filled rectangle intersecting at least 1/4 of the unit square must intersect one of these points. In fact, any (axis-parallel) square, regardless of size, will have a similar 8-point 1/4-net.

For any range space with finite VC dimension d, regardless of the choice of P, there exists an ε-net of P of size

$O\left(\frac{d}{\varepsilon} \log \frac{d}{\varepsilon}\right)\!;$

because the size of this set is independent of P, any set P can be described using a set of fixed size.

This facilitates the development of efficient approximation algorithms. For example, suppose we wish to estimate an upper bound on the area of a given region, that falls inside a particular rectangle P. One can estimate this to within an additive factor of ε times the area of P by first finding an ε-net of P, counting the proportion of elements in the ε-net falling inside the region with respect to the rectangle P, and then multiplying by the area of P. The runtime of the algorithm depends only on ε and not P. One straightforward way to compute an ε-net with high probability is to take a sufficient number of random points, where the number of random points also depends only on ε. For example, in the diagram shown, any rectangle in the unit square containing at most three points in the 1/4-net has an area of at most 3/8 + 1/4 = 5/8.

ε-nets also provide approximation algorithms for the NP-complete hitting set and set cover problems.

== Probability theory ==
Let $P$ be a probability distribution over some set $X$. An $\varepsilon$-net for a class $H \subseteq 2^X$ of subsets of $X$ is any subset $S \subseteq X$ such that for any $h \in H$

$$P(h) \ge \varepsilon \quad \Longrightarrow \quad S\cap h \neq \varnothing.$$

Intuitively $S$ approximates the probability distribution.

A stronger notion is $\varepsilon$-approximation. An $\varepsilon$-approximation for class $H$ is a subset $S \subseteq X$ such that for any $h \in H$ it holds

$$\left| P(h) - \frac{|S \cap h|}{|S|} \right| < \varepsilon .$$
