= Alexey Chervonenkis =

Soviet and Russian mathematician (1938–2014)

Alexey Yakovlevich Chervonenkis (Russian: Алексей Яковлевич Червоненкис; 7 September 1938 – 22 September 2014) was a Soviet and Russian mathematician. Along with Vladimir Vapnik, he was one of the main developers of the Vapnik–Chervonenkis theory, also known as the "fundamental theory of learning", an important part of computational learning theory. By the time of his death, Chervonenkis held joint appointments with the Russian Academy of Sciences and Royal Holloway, University of London.

Alexey Chervonenkis got lost in Losiny Ostrov National Park on 22 September 2014, and later during a search operation was found dead near Mytishchi, a suburb of Moscow. He had died of hypothermia.
