= Goodhand =

Goodhand is a surname. Notable people with the surname include:

- Margo Goodhand, Canadian journalist
- Peter Goodhand, health research executive
- Phillip Goodhand-Tait (born 1945), English singer-songwriter, record producer, and keyboard player

== See also ==
- Good Hands (disambiguation)
