= MyBioSource =

Biotech distribution company

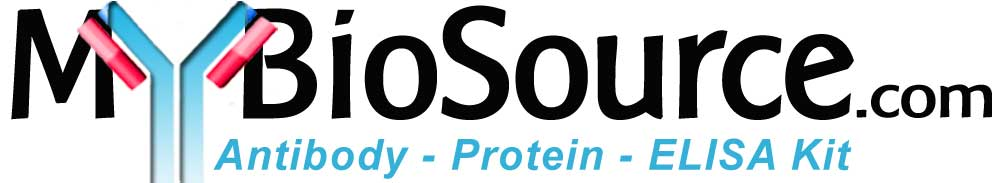
- Company type: Public
- Industry: Biotech, Life Sciences, Manufacturing
- Founded: 2007 in Vancouver, Canada
- Headquarters: San Diego, United States
- Area served: Worldwide
- Number of employees: 25–30
- Website: www.mybiosource.com

MyBioSource, Inc. is a biotechnological products distribution company formed to create a large portfolio of laboratory research reagents, both hard to find and common items, with worldwide distributions. Backed by a network of laboratories and manufacturers, the company was launched in 2007 in Vancouver, British Columbia, Canada. Headquarters and operations were relocated to San Diego, United States.

== Products ==
The company distributes a number of science reagents and assay kits, including custom recombinant proteins and antibodies, real time PCR and quantitative ELISA kits. The company's current catalog lists over 1 million individual products used in academic, biotechnological, and pharmaceutical industries.

== Peer reviews ==
One peer-reviewed article that compared the specificity of several, commercially available kits for glucagon and oxyntomodulin found that the MyBioSource assay (MBS701592) for detecting oxyntomodulin "yielded inconsistent results". And another article investigated the specificity of commercially available EIA kits for identification of neutralizing antibodies to adenovirus Ad36 found that "all seronegative samples (as determined by SNA) were false positive" by MyBioSource's Ad36 EIA (MBS705802).

== Publications with MyBioSource products ==
- Dubuisson, O., Day, R. S., Dhurandhar, N. V. (2015) Accurate identification of neutralizing antibodies to adenovirus Ad36, -a putative contributor of obesity in humans. J Diabetes Complications 29, 83–87

== See also ==
- PolyAnalytik
