= Adam C. Siepel =

American computational biologist (born 1972)

Adam Siepel
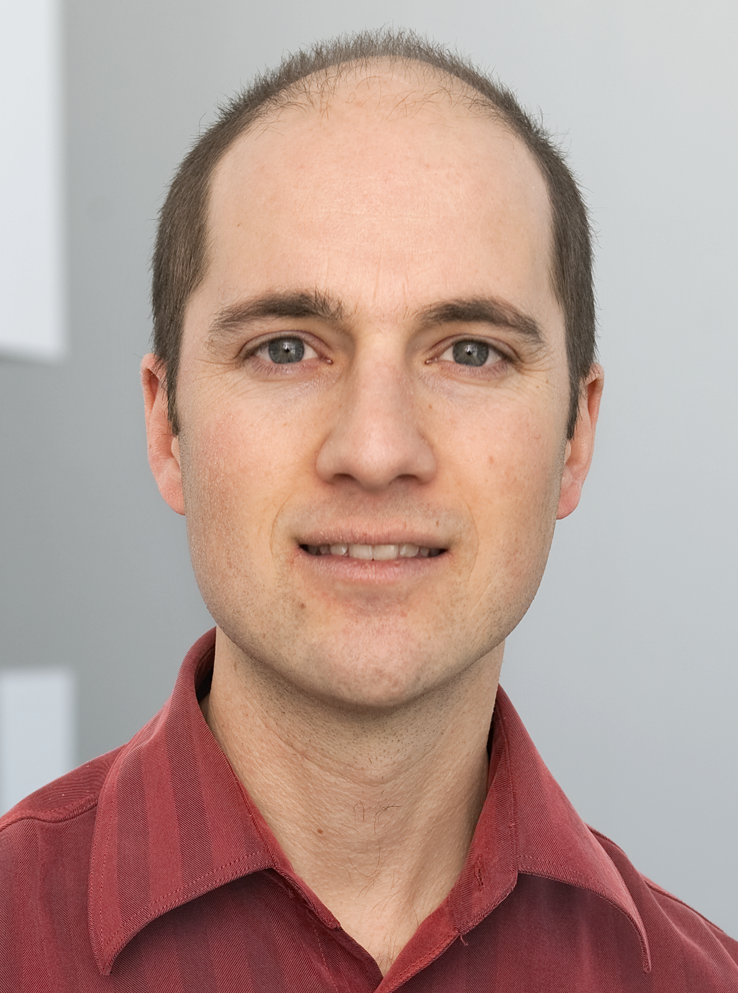
- Adam Siepel in 2009.
- Born: Adam C. Siepel; June 24, 1972 (age 54); United States
- Education: Cornell University (BS); University of New Mexico (MS); University of California, Santa Cruz (PhD)
- Known for: evolutionarily conserved sequences
- Awards: Packard Fellowship (2007); Microsoft Research Faculty Fellowship (2007); National Science Foundation CAREER Award (2007); Sloan Fellowship (2009); Guggenheim Fellowship (2012)
- Scientific career
- Fields: Genomics; Molecular evolution; Computational biology; Gene regulation; Population genetics
- Workplaces: Cold Spring Harbor Laboratory; Cornell University; Los Alamos National Laboratory; National Center for Genome Resources
- Thesis: Comparative mammalian genomics: Models of evolution and detection of functional elements (2005)
- Doctoral advisor: David Haussler
- Website: siepellab.labsites.cshl.edu

Adam C. Siepel (born 1972) is an American computational biologist known for his research in comparative genomics and population genetics, particularly the development of statistical methods and software tools for identifying evolutionarily conserved sequences. Siepel is currently Chair of the Simons Center for Quantitative Biology and Professor in the Watson School for Biological Sciences at Cold Spring Harbor Laboratory.

== Education and career ==
Siepel completed a B.S. in Agricultural and Biological Engineering at Cornell University in 1994, then worked at Los Alamos National Laboratory until 1996. From 1996 to 2001, he worked as a software developer at the National Center for Genome Resources in Santa Fe, while completing an M.S. in Computer Science at the University of New Mexico. He obtained a Ph.D. in computer science from the University of California, Santa Cruz in 2005. He was on the faculty of Cornell University from 2006 to 2014 and moved to Cold Spring Harbor Laboratory in 2014.

== Research ==
Siepel has worked on various problems at the intersection of computer science, statistics, evolutionary biology, and genomics. At Los Alamos National Laboratory, he developed phylogenetic methods for detecting recombinant strains of HIV, and at the National Center for Genome Resources, he led the development of ISYS, a technology for integrating heterogeneous bioinformatics databases, analysis tools, and visualization programs. Siepel also did theoretical work on algorithms for phylogeny reconstruction based on genome rearrangements, working with Bernard Moret at the University of New Mexico. When Siepel left software development to join David Haussler's laboratory at the University of California, Santa Cruz, he turned to computational problems in comparative genomics. In Haussler's group, he developed several analysis methods based on phylogenetic hidden Markov models, including a widely used program called phastCons for identifying evolutionarily conserved sequences in genomic sequences.

At Cornell, Siepel's research group continued to work on the identification and characterization of conserved non-coding sequences. They also studied fast-evolving sequences in both coding and noncoding regions, including human accelerated regions. In recent years, the Siepel laboratory has increasingly focused on human population genetics, developing methods for estimating the times in early human history when major population groups first diverged, for measuring the influence of natural selection on transcription factor binding sites, and for estimating probabilities that mutations across the human genome will have fitness consequences. The group also has an active research program in transcriptional regulation, carried out in close collaboration with John T. Lis's laboratory.

A common theme in Siepel's research is the development of precise mathematical models for the complex processes by which genomes evolve over time. His research group uses these models, together with techniques from computer science and statistics, both to peer into the past, and to address questions of practical importance for human health.

== Awards and honours ==
Siepel was a recipient of a Guggenheim Fellowship in 2012. He was also awarded a David and Lucile Packard Fellowship for Science and Engineering in 2007, a Microsoft Research Faculty Fellowship in 2007, and a Sloan Research Fellowship in 2009.
