= Juan Carlos Zúñiga-Pflücker =

American-Canadian immunologist

- Born: May 12, 1965 (age 59)
- Known for: Delta-like/Notch interactions for T cell differentiation
- Scientific career
- Fields: Biology

Juan Carlos Zúñiga-Pflücker (born May 12, 1965) is an American-Canadian immunologist, currently a Canada Research Chair at the University of Toronto. His research focuses on the signaling processes that occur during the differentiation of cells in the immune system.

== Education ==
Zúñiga-Pflücker obtained his BSc in zoology from the University of Maryland in 1987 and his PhD in genetics and immunology from George Washington University in 1991.

== Career ==
Zúñiga-Pflücker is a senior scientist in Biological Sciences at the Odette Cancer Research Program at the Sunnybrook Research Institute. He was also the former chair of, and professor in, the Department of Immunology at the University of Toronto. He is a fellow of Trinity College at the University of Toronto, and a member of the collaborative graduate program in developmental biology.

Zúñiga-Pflücker is a Tier 1 Canada Research Chair in Developmental Immunology.

His research focuses on blood cell differentiation, specifically the signaling that hematopoietic progenitor cells receive in the thymus to commit to the T cell lineage and undergo T cell differentiation.

=== Research contributions ===
Zúñiga-Pflücker identified the importance of Delta-like/Notch interactions for T cell differentiation in the thymus. Normally, OP9 cells, a bone marrow-derived stromal cell line, support the differentiation of hematopoietic stem cells into B cells. His lab identified that when OP9 cells ectopically express the Notch receptor ligands Delta-like-1 or Delta-like-4 they encourage T cell differentiation instead. OP9 cells expressing Delta-like-1 or Delta-like-4 were also able to induce differentiation of totipotent embryonic stem cells into functional T cells.

== External References ==
1. Dr. Juan Carlos Zuniga-Pflucker
