= Arpeggi =

Arpeggi may refer to:

- the original name of the song "Weird Fishes / Arpeggi", by Radiohead
- Arpeggi, Inc., a bioinformatics startup company acquired by Gene by Gene in 2013
- the plural of arpeggio
