= Callum Bell =

Biologist

- Education: University of Edinburgh
- Occupation: Biologist

Callum James Bell is a biologist. He is the president of the National Center for Genome Resources. Bell completed a Ph.D. at University of Edinburgh where he researched the gravitational biology of Arabidopsis thaliana. His 1988 dissertation was titled Studies of mutants of Arabidopsis thaliana (L.) heynh with altered responses to gravity.
