= David Haussler =

American bioinformatician

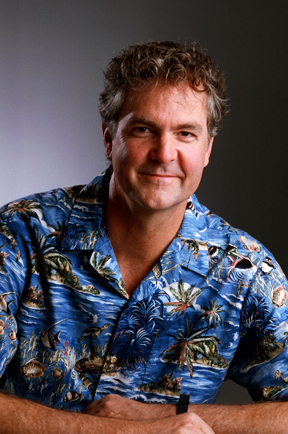
- Born: David Haussler; October 1953 (age 73)
- Education: Connecticut College (BA); California Polytechnic State University (MS); University of Colorado Boulder (PhD)
- Known for: Hidden Markov models; Human Genome Project
- Awards: Member of the National Academy of Sciences (2006); Member of the National Academy of Engineering - Bioengineering (2018); Fellow of the National Academy of Inventors (2025); Weldon Memorial Prize (2011); Curt Stern Award (2009); ISCB Senior Scientist Award (2008); ISCB Fellow (2009); Dickson Prize (2005); Dan David Prize (2015); AAAI Fellow (1993)
- Scientific career
- Fields: Neuroscience; Genomics; Computer science; Molecular biology; Evolution; Cancer
- Workplaces: University of California, Santa Cruz
- Thesis: Insertion and iterated insertion as operations on formal language (1982)
- Doctoral advisor: Andrzej Ehrenfeucht
- Doctoral students: Yoav Freund; Adam Siepel; Jim Kent; Kimmen Sjölander; Melissa Cline
- Other notable students: Anders Krogh: Katherine Pollard; Jian Ma; Karen Miga; Mathieu Blanchette; Anders Krogh
- Website: stemcellgenomics.ucsc.edu

David Haussler (born 1953) is an American bioinformatician known for his work leading the team that assembled the first human genome sequence in the race to complete the Human Genome Project and subsequently for comparative genome analysis that deepens understanding the molecular function and evolution of the genome.

Haussler was elected a member of the National Academy of Sciences in 2006 and the National Academy of Engineering in 2018 for developments in computational learning theory and bioinformatics, including first assembly of the human genome, its analysis, and data sharing. He has consistently been recognized as one of the most cited researchers in his field every year for well over a decade.

He is a distinguished professor of biomolecular engineering and founding scientific director of the UC Santa Cruz Genomics Institute at the University of California, Santa Cruz, director of the California Institute for Quantitative Biosciences (QB3) on the UC Santa Cruz campus, and a consulting professor at the Stanford University School of Medicine and the UC San Francisco Biopharmaceutical Sciences Department.

== Education ==
Haussler studied art briefly at the Academy of Art in San Francisco in 1971 and then psychotherapy at Immaculate Heart College in Hollywood until 1973, when he transferred to Connecticut College, finishing in 1975 with a major in mathematics and minor in physics. He earned an MS in applied mathematics from California Polytechnic State University, San Luis Obispo in 1979. Haussler received his PhD in computer science from the University of Colorado Boulder in 1982.

== Career and research ==
During summers while he was in college, Haussler worked for his brother, Mark Haussler, a biochemist at the University of Arizona studying vitamin D metabolism. They were the first to measure the levels of Calcitriol, the hormonal form of vitamin D, in the human bloodstream. Between 1975 and 1979 he traveled and worked a variety of jobs, including a job at a petroleum refinery in Burghausen, Germany, tomato farming on Crete, and farming kiwifruit, almonds, and walnuts in Templeton, CA. While in Templeton he worked on his master's degree at nearby California Polytechnic University.

Haussler was an assistant professor in Mathematics and Computer Science at the University of Denver from 1982 to 1986. From 1986 to the present, he has been at UC Santa Cruz, initially in the Computer Science Department, and in 2004 as an inaugural member of the Biomolecular Engineering Department.

While pursuing his doctorate in theoretical computer science at the University of Colorado, Haussler became interested in the mathematical analysis of DNA along with fellow students Gene Myers, Gary Stormo, and Manfred Warmuth. Haussler's current research stems from his early work in machine learning. In 1988 he organized the first Workshop on Computational learning Theory with Leonard Pitt. With Blumer, Ehrenfeucht, and Warmuth he introduced the Vapnik-Chervonenkis framework to computational learning theory, solving some problems posed by Leslie Valiant. In the 1990s he obtained various results in information theory, empirical processes, artificial intelligence, neural networks, statistical decision theory, and pattern recognition. At present, his lab grows human cerebral organoids for neurodevelopmental disease research and to explore human neural circuit formation and learning.

Haussler's research combines mathematics, computer science, and molecular biology. He develops new statistical and algorithmic methods to explore the molecular function and evolution of the human genome, integrating cross-species comparative and high-throughput genomics data to study gene structure, function, and regulation. He is credited with pioneering the use of Hidden Markov models (HMMs), stochastic context-free grammars, and the discriminative kernel method for analyzing DNA, RNA, and protein sequences. He was the first to apply the latter methods to the genome-wide search for gene expression biomarkers in cancer.

As a collaborator on the international Human Genome Project, his team, featuring programming work by graduate student Jim Kent, computationally assembled the first draft of the human genome and posted it on the Internet on July 7, 2000. Following this, his team developed the UCSC Genome Browser, a web-based tool that is used extensively in biomedical research and serves as the platform for several large-scale genomics projects. This and related platforms, including the UCSC Cell Browser and the UCSC Cancer Genomics Browser (now called the Xena Browser) have been used extensively in a number of large omics projects, including the National Human Genome Research Institute (NHGRI)'s ENCODE project to explore the function of every base in the human genome, NIH's Mammalian Gene Collection, NHGRI's 1000 genomes project to explore human genetic variation, the Human Pangenome Reference Consortium to replace the single reference human genome with a collection of genomes from around the world, the National Cancer Institute (NCI) Cancer Genome Atlas project to explore the genomic changes in cancer, and the National Institute of Mental Health's SSPsyGene consortium to explore genotypes and phenotypes of neurodevelopment and psychiatric disorders.

His group's informatics work on cancer genomics, including the UCSC Cancer Genomics Browser, provides a complete analysis pipeline from raw DNA reads through the detection and interpretation of mutations and altered gene expression in tumor samples. His group collaborates with researchers at medical centers nationally, including members of the Stand Up To Cancer "Dream Teams" and the Cancer Genome Atlas, to discover molecular causes of cancer and develop a new personalized, genomics-based approach to cancer treatment.

Haussler is one of eight organizing committee members of the Global Alliance for Genomics and Health (GA4GH), an organization that continues to set standards for sharing genomic data today. Haussler served as founding vice-chair of the GA4GH steering committee in 2013, alongside fellow founding committee members David Altshuler from the Broad Institute of Harvard and MIT; Peter Goodhand and Thomas Hudson from the Ontario Institute for Cancer Research; Brad Margus from the A-T Children's Project; Elizabeth Nabel from Brigham and Women's Hospital; Charles Sawyers from Memorial Sloan-Kettering; and Michael Stratton from Wellcome Trust Sanger Institute.

He co-founded the Genome 10K Project (now superseded by the Vertebrate Genomes Project) to assemble a genomic zoo—a collection of DNA sequences representing the genomes of 10,000 vertebrate species—to capture genetic diversity as a resource for the life sciences and for worldwide conservation efforts.

His current research focuses on cerebral organoids. He is a member of the Braingeneers, an interdisciplinary research group from UC Santa Cruz, UC San Francisco, UC Berkeley, and Washington University in St. Louis that grows and studies brain organoids to better understand how human neural circuits form and adapt to experience, and how gene variants predispose individuals to neurodevelopmental and neuropsychiatric disease.

== Awards and honors ==
Haussler is a member of the National Academy of Sciences, the National Academy of Engineering, and the American Academy of Arts and Sciences and a Fellow of the National Academy of Inventors and Association for the Advancement of Artificial Intelligence (AAAI). His awards include the 2011 Weldon Memorial Prize from University of Oxford, the 2009 American Society of Human Genetics (ASHG) Curt Stern Award in Human Genetics, the 2008 ISCB Senior Scientist Award from the International Society for Computational Biology (who also elected him an ISCB Fellow in 2009), the 2005 Dickson Prize for Science from Carnegie Mellon University, and the 2003 Association for Computing Machinery (ACM)/Association for the Advancement of Artificial Intelligence (AAAI) Allen Newell Award in Artificial Intelligence.

With Cyrus Chothia and Michael Waterman, Haussler was awarded the 2015 Dan David Prize for his contributions to the field of bioinformatics.
