= UCPH Bioinformatics Centre =

Coordinates: 55.6993°N 12.5569°E

The Bioinformatics Centre is an interdisciplinary research in bioinformatics at the University of Copenhagen (UCPH). The centre is housed in the Section for Computational and RNA Biology at the Department of Biology within the Faculty of Science.

== Programmes ==
The Bioinformatics Centre is in charge of a masters program in bioinformatics.

== Organisation ==
There are four different subgroups in the center, each focussing on different topics:

- Micro-RNA group: micro-RNA's are small RNA molecules with important roles in regulation of gene expression. The group analyses the biology of micro-RNA's using computational methods and develop tools that are useful for experimental biologists.
- Non-coding RNA group: Many RNA molecules play a functional role in the cell that is different from the classic role of serving as a template for protein synthesis. The group works on secondary structure prediction and multiple alignment of non-coding RNA's.
- Promotor analysis group: The group develops statistical and bioinformatics methods to analyze the regulation of transcription of eukaryotic genes. This includes modelling of epigenetics, transcription factor binding sites, core promoters and transcription start sites
- Structure group: the group develops protein and RNA 3-D structure prediction methods based on graphical models and Bayesian networks, directional statistics and Markov chain Monte Carlo methods. The group is also a leading area of research into probabilistic programming methods for protein structure prediction.

== People ==
The center is headed by Anders Krogh, who pioneered the use of hidden Markov models in bioinformatics, together with David Haussler. The center further consists of six postdocs and about 17 PhD students.
