= Manfred K. Warmuth =

German computer scientist

Manfred Klaus Warmuth
- Education: University of Colorado, Boulder
- Known for: Weighted majority algorithm; Occam learning; Introducing VC-dimension to computational learning theory
- Awards: Elected to Leopoldina (2021)
- Scientific career
- Fields: Computer Science
- Workplaces: University of California, Santa Cruz; Google
- Doctoral advisor: Hal Gabow
- Doctoral students: Yoav Freund

Manfred Klaus Warmuth is a computer scientist known for his pioneering research in computational learning theory. He is a Distinguished Professor emeritus at the University of California, Santa Cruz.

== Education and career ==
After studying computer science at the University of Erlangen–Nuremberg, earning a diploma in 1978, Warmuth went to the University of Colorado Boulder for graduate study, earning a master's degree there in 1980 and completing his Ph.D. in 1981. His doctoral dissertation, Scheduling on Profiles of Constant Breadth, was supervised by Harold N. Gabow.

After postdoctoral research at the University of California, Berkeley and Hebrew University of Jerusalem, Warmuth joined the University of California, Santa Cruz in 1983, became Distinguished Professor there in 2017, and retired as a professor emeritus in 2018. He was a visiting faculty member at Google Brain from 2019 to 2020.

== Contributions ==
With his student Nick Littlestone, Warmuth published the weighted majority algorithm for combining the results for multiple predictors in 1989.^{[WM]}

Warmuth was also the coauthor of an influential 1989 paper in the Journal of the ACM, with Anselm Blumer, Andrzej Ehrenfeucht, David Haussler, introducing the Vapnik–Chervonenkis dimension to computational learning theory.^{[VC]} With the same authors, he also introduced Occam learning in 1987.^{[OR]}

== Recognition ==
In 2021, Warmuth became a member of the German National Academy of Sciences Leopoldina.

== Selected publications ==
VC.	Blumer, Anselm; Ehrenfeucht, Andrzej; Haussler, David; Warmuth, Manfred K. (1989), "Learnability and the Vapnik–Chervonenkis dimension", Journal of the ACM, 36 (4): 929–965, doi:10.1145/76359.76371, MR 1072253, S2CID 1138467; a preliminary version, "Classifying learnable geometric concepts with the Vapnik–Chervonenkis dimension", was presented at the ACM Symposium on Theory of Computing (STOC 1986), doi:10.1145/12130.12158

OR.	Blumer, Anselm; Ehrenfeucht, Andrzej; Haussler, David; Warmuth, Manfred K. (1987), "Occam's razor", Information Processing Letters, 24 (6): 377–380, doi:10.1016/0020-0190(87)90114-1, MR 0896392

WM.	Littlestone, Nick; Warmuth, Manfred K. (1994), "The weighted majority algorithm", Information and Computation, 108 (2): 212–261, doi:10.1006/inco.1994.1009, MR 1265851; announced at the IEEE Symposium on Foundations of Computer Science (FOCS 1989), doi:10.1109/SFCS.1989.63487
