= Joan Warnow-Blewett =

American archivist

- Born: Joan Carol Nelson; December 11, 1931
- Died: May 30, 2006 (aged 74); Alamo, California US
- Other names: Joan Nelson; Joan Warnow; Joan Blewett
- Occupation: Archivist
- Years active: 1965–1997
- Spouses: Morton Warnow; John P. Blewett; Martin J. Klein
- Children: Paul Warnow, Kimmen Sjolander, and Tandy Warnow

Joan Carol Warnow-Blewett (née Nelson) (December 11, 1931 – May 30, 2006) was an American archivist and staff member of the American Institute of Physics (AIP) for 32 years.

== Early life ==
Warnow-Blewett was born to parents David Nelson and Edith Nelson (née Sjölander), American immigrants who were born in Sweden.

== Career ==
In 1965, Warnow-Blewett was hired at American Institute of Physics (AIP) as Librarian of the Niels Bohr Library. In 1974, she was promoted to Associate Director for the Center for History of Physics.

From 1986 to 1989, she was a council member of the Society of American Archivists.

== Contribution to scientific collaboration ==
Warnow-Blewett's work was a significant influence on the book, Structures of Scientific Collaboration by Wesley Shrum, Joel Genuth and Ivan Chompalov.

Starting in 1989, she assembled a multi-disciplinary team including social sciences, history and archives. This team collected data on 60 scientific collaborations over the span of a decade. They coded the interviews with the collaborative teams in order to create a massive database covering themes such as "invention and practice; and issues of specialization, decision-making, values, subcontracting, instrumentation, funding and, of course, credit allocation."

== Personal life ==
Warnow-Blewett was married three times. Her first marriage, which was until 1964, was to inventor Morton Warnow, with whom she had three children. In 1983, she married physicist John Paul Blewett and was married to Blewett until his death in 2000. Her third marriage was to physics historian, Martin Klein. She had three children: Paul Warnow, Kimmen Sjolander, and Tandy Warnow.

Warnow-Blewett died in Alamo, California, on May 30, 2006.

== Selected publications ==
Between 1970 and 2001, Warnow-Blewett published 60 works in 105 publications. She continued to publish after her retirement from the AIP in August 1997.

- Warnow-Blewett, Joan; Genuth, Joel; Weart, Spencer R. (2001). AIP Study of Multi-Institutional Collaborations. Final Report Documenting Multi-Institutional Collaborations. College Park, Maryland: Center for History of Physics, American Institute of Physics. OCLC 47204030.
- Warnow-Blewett, Joan; Teichmann, Jürgen (1992). Guide to Sources for History of Solid State Physics, Report No. 6. New York: Center for History of Physics, American Institute of Physics. ISBN 978-1-56-396068-0. OCLC 27761357.
- Warnow-Blewett, Joan (1985). Guidelines for Records Appraisal at Major Research Facilities: Selection of Permanent Records of DOE Laboratories. Institutional Management and Policy, and Physics Research (AIP publication, R-324). New York: Center for History of Physics, American Institute of Physics. OCLC 13356678.
