= Good Hands =

Good Hands may refer to:

- Good Hands (Arthurian legend), a Knight of the Round Table in Arthurian Legend
- Good Hands Records, an independent hip hop record label
- Good Hands (film), Estonian-Latvian 2001 feature film

== See also ==
- Goodhand
