= Mygene =

MyGene Pty Ltd
- Type: Private
- Industry: Biotechnology
- Founded: [Melbourne 2007]
- Founder: Harry Banaharis
- Defunct: 11 September 2013
- Fate: Dissolved
- Headquarters: Melbourne, Victoria, Australia
- Key people: David Koadlow, Chairman, Nick Argyrou, CEO, Dr Graeme Smith, CSO
- Services: Genetic testing
- Owner: MyGene Holdings Pty Ltd
- Number of employees: 15
- Subsidiaries: Advanced DNA Laboratories Pty Ltd; Genetic Sciences Pty Ltd; Genetic Investments Pty Ltd
- Website: web.archive.org/web/20130502173350/http://www.mygene.com.au/

== Disambiguation ==
This article relates to the former Australian company MyGene Pty Ltd (ACN 137 407 848 ) that traded between 2007 and 2013 and does not relate to the Australian company MyGene Pty Ltd incorporated in 2020 (ACN 646 563 064) and currently trading.

MyGene Pty. Ltd. was a privately held genetic testing services company located in Melbourne, Australia that owned and operated an accredited on-site laboratory.

MyGene specialised in the development of genetic tests and interpretive reports that assessed the genetic contribution of personal response to diet, also known as nutrigenetics.

== Establishment ==
MyGene was conceived and established by Harry Banaharis during work done initially in profiling umbilical cord blood and later mesenchymal stem cells. The business value proposition anticipated a desire by individuals to understand their genetic individuality and how such knowledge could be used to personalise diet and exercise choices for improved health outcomes. In its initial conception the business would sub-contract a laboratory to perform the genetic test and provide an interpretive web-based report. After some attempts to secure Australian laboratories to perform the testing in a commercially viable manner he decided to establish his own.

In 2006, he funded and deployed a prototype gene testing laboratory within the Alfred Hospital research centre utilising a Biotage Pyrosequencer instrument for analysing epigenetic changes in the promoter of TGF-beta gene to generate data towards his Honours thesis.

In 2007 he established the MyGene "DNA to data" commercial laboratory in Melbourne CBD and released the first prototype direct to consumer genetic testing kit, the Sports Performance Gene Test. It analysed single nucleotide polymorphisms (SNPs) in 2 genes known to vary in power versus endurance athletes, ACTN3 and ACE I/D and a gene associated with impact sports head injury, APOE4. The kit included 2 buccal swabs to ensure sufficient material was collected, a card that contained the access code for retrieving the web-based results and an envelope to mail the swabs to the laboratory.

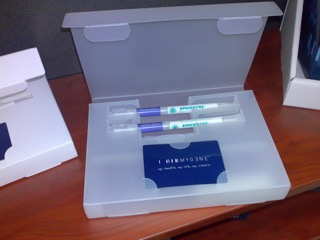
The MyGene Genetic Testing Kit with 2 coded swabs for buccal collection and customer ID card

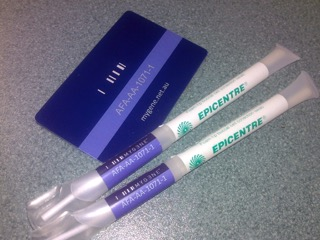
Detail of collection swabs and customer ID card

Mygene Sports Performance Gene Test Brochure

== Expansion ==
In 2009 Harry Banaharis was joined by Nick Argyrou, a property developer and former SelecTV director and his wife Helen Argyrou, a pharmacy entrepreneur. The Argyrou's saw an opportunity to innovate in the crowded meal replacement market and the newly resourced company was oriented towards pursuing the development of nutrigenetic products and services.

Graeme Smith, a nutritional biochemist and biomedical researcher, was recruited to help formulate the meal replacement variants and develop accompanying genetically prescribed weight loss programs.

In 2010, David Koadlow, also a major investor in another Australian genetic testing company, Lumigenix (The Age: Tapping into your Genes), acquired a controlling share in MyGene and helped fuel its transition into the world's first genetic testing company that offered a range of genetically matched meal replacement formulations known as the MyGene Weightloss Complete Genetic Program.

In 2011 Dr Les Sheffield, founder of MyDNA (MyDNA - About Us), became a member of MyGene's scientific advisory board (Bloomberg).

== Nutrigenetics ==
MyGene's novel approach to predicting the hereditary component of dietary response was to test for variations in genes that were known to be associated with disorders of glucose and lipid metabolism (see US application 2012258183).

According to this method, the greater the number of genetic variants that an individual was found to carry that increased the risk of metabolic disturbances in glucose metabolism, the greater the sensitivity to dietary carbohydrates. Similarly, the number of genetic variations associated with adverse lipid metabolism was considered to be proportional to dietary fat sensitivity.

Sensitivity to a macronutrient would indicate that its reduction in the diet may have conferred increased metabolic and health benefits. Further refinements to personalising diet included tests for genes associated with gluten sensitivity, lactose intolerance, salt palatability, appetite control, folate and Vitamin D metabolism.

== MyGene Weightloss Complete Genetic Program ==
In 2011 MyGene brought to market a nutrigenetic dietary program to optimise weight loss that was composed of a genetic test, a genetically allocated meal replacement formulation and 12-week dietary program (MyGene Weightloss Complete). Via a collaboration with The Pharmacy Guild of Australia (Australia's chief pharmacy body representing community pharmacies) a select number of participating pharmacies provided MyGene consulting rooms whereby customers had DNA samples collected and were counselled on the type of dietary regime required (according to their genetic test results) to achieve their desired weight management goals. The program was also offered in a clinical setting for the treatment of obesity.

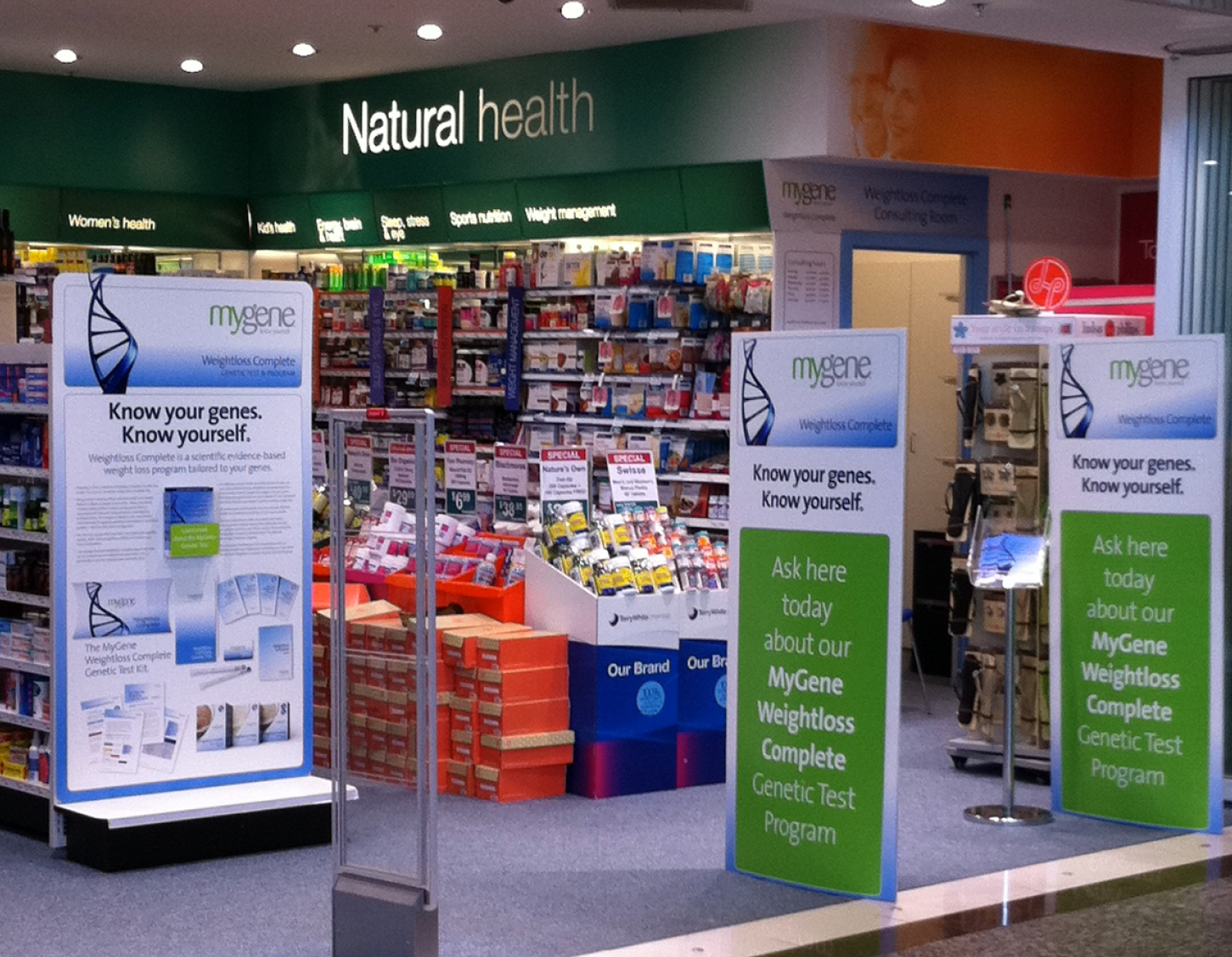
MyGene promotional advertising at a "Terry White" Toorak Road, Melbourne, Australia Pharmacy.

== Program Withdrawal ==
Despite the support of the Pharmacy Guild the claims in MyGene's nutrigenetic dietary program were met with scepticism particularly as supporting clinical research was found to be lacking. Dr. Ken Harvey, from the school of public health at La Trobe University challenged MyGene to provide evidence on the sensitivity and specificity of the tests being offered. With no response to the increasing number of questions being raised about MyGene's nutrigenetic test and a campaign by the Professional Pharmacists Australia association to have Pharmacy endorsement rescinded the Weightloss Complete Genetic Program was withdrawn from the market during 2012.

In 2016, in a recapitulation of MyGene's contentious reception in the Australian market, the myDNA pharmacogenetic test met with similar scepticism regarding clinical utility and patient benefits. Like MyGene's nutrigenetic test, myDNA's pharmacogenetic test is being distributed via pharmacy outlets.

== Voluntary Administration & Wind Up ==
On 11 September 2013, following long standing differences between its major shareholders MyGene was placed in voluntary administration by the majority owner, David Koadlow, and wound up.

== See also ==
- Genetic testing
- Nutrigenetics
- Pharmacogenetics
- Genetic counseling
- PolyAnalytik
