= Bennett Greenspan =

Founder of Family Tree DNA

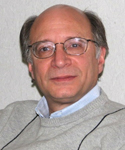
- Born: 1952 (age 73–74); Omaha, Nebraska, USA
- Education: University of Texas
- Occupations: Managing partner of Gene by Gene, president and CEO of Family Tree DNA
- Known for: Founder of Family Tree DNA

Bennett C. Greenspan (born 1952) is an American businessman. His business ventures have covered industries from real estate to the .com boom. Though he has mainly worked in the fields of photography and genetic testing, he is best known for his pioneering work in genetic genealogy.

Greenspan founded Family Tree DNA which was the first American company to offer genealogical DNA testing directly to the general public. He is currently the president and chief executive officer (CEO) and also the managing partner of Family Tree DNA's parent company Gene by Gene.

Greenspan is also the project administrator of several surname DNA projects, and regularly lectures on the use of genetics in genealogy and on genomics.

== Personal life ==
A Jewish American, Greenspan was born in Omaha, Nebraska to Maurice and Rosalie Greenspan. He and his brother were raised there. As a young child, Greenspan had a love of family history and would interview the oldest members of his family during gatherings. He drew his first family tree when he was 11 or 12.

Nancy Summer and Bennett Greenspan qualified as quarter finalists in the South High Novice Debate Tournament in October. Both divisions attended the OU Debate Tournament in November.

— Tournaments Spell Success As Debaters Earn Honors – The Shield 1968

Greenspan attended Westside High School and was part of the graduating class of 1970. In high school, he was involved with the debate team. There, he gained valuable speaking skills. Outside school, he was part of the Omaha Chaim Weizmann AZA chapter, a Jewish youth group. As part of that group, he originated the idea for brightly colored Civil Rights Movement seals in 1969. These were marketed both locally, and in The National Jewish Monthly, to raise funds for the group, as well as human rights awareness.

Upon graduation, Greenspan moved south to Texas, and studied political science at the University of Texas. He graduated with a BA. After graduating, he took additional courses in business and entrepreneurship at SMU in Dallas between 1975 and 1976. He did not, however, complete the program.

After college, business interests took Greenspan away from Texas. However, he returned in 1980 and has since remained there. While he married his wife near family in Los Angeles County, California, their two children were born and raised in Texas.

Greenspan is a supporter of AIPAC, and has donated over $40,000 to its PACs.

== Early business ventures ==
Greenspan's first two businesses involved photographic supplies. The second of these was Industrial Photographic Supply. Based in Texas, from 1980 to 1996, it sold industrial grade goods to advertising agencies, art studios, newspapers, and printing companies. In its first four years, its profit grew by over 600 percent. This company was sold to Bell Industries, Inc in 1996. Greenspan remained as an employee of the new owners for roughly a year.

In 1997, Greenspan founded GoCollege.com with Max Blankfeld. GoCollege.com is an online college-search website. While there, he was the chief executive officer.

== FamilyTreeDNA ==
After leaving GoCollege.com, Greenspan became semi-retired and returned to working on his family history. In 1999, he began work on his mother's Nitz lineage. When faced with an unsurmountable obstacle using standard genealogical methods in his work, he remembered two cases of genetics being used to prove ancestry that had recently been covered by the media. One was a study by University of Arizona researchers showing that many Cohen men from both Ashkenazic and Sephardic groups share the same Y-Chromosome pattern of markers, the Cohen Modal Haplotype. The other was a DNA study showing that male descendants of US President Thomas Jefferson with the Jefferson surname, and male descendants of his freed slave Sally Hemings, shared the same Y-Chromosome markers and a recent common ancestry.

Greenspan had Nitz cousins in California, and he had discovered someone in Argentina with the same ancestral surname and the same ancestral location in Eastern Europe. Wishing to use the same method of DNA comparison for his own genealogy, he contacted Dr. Michael Hammer at the University of Arizona. Their conversation inspired Greenspan to start a company dedicated to using genetics to solve genealogy problems, Family Tree DNA.

As personal genetic ancestry and genealogy industries grew, and so did Family Tree DNA. In 2004, Greenspan and Blankfeld hosted the first conference for advocates in the field. However, the industry faced ethics and infrastructure challenges.

== Gene by Gene ==
Though Family Tree DNA originally partnered with the University of Arizona for testing, Greenspan, and his now longtime business partner Max Blankfeld, eventually started their own testing laboratory in Houston, Texas under the Genealogy by Genetics, Ltd. parent company. This is the Genomics Research Center (GRC) laboratory in Houston, Texas. With the opening of the GRC, Greenspan and Blankfeld formed additional business units under the Genealogy by Genetics company, between 2008 and 2012, to sell non-genealogical genetics tests.

In September 2012, Greenspan and Blankfeld restructured Genealogy by Genetics, Ltd. This included renaming it Gene by Gene, Ltd. After restructuring, the business comprises four divisions. These are DNA DTC, DNA Findings, DNA Traits, and Family Tree DNA.

== Publications ==
- Greenspan, Bennett (Spring 2008). "Can DNA Testing Confirm Jewish Ancestry?" (PDF). Avotaynu. XXIV (1): 11–12. Archived from the original (PDF) on October 8, 2013.
- Greenspan, Bennett (November 2010). "An Insider's Look at the Genealogy DNA Field" (PDF). Texas Jewish Historical Society: 1–5. Archived from the original (PDF) on December 20, 2015.
- Elhaik, E.; Greenspan, E.; Staats, S.; et al. (2013). "The GenoChip: A New Tool for Genetic Anthropology". Genome Biology and Evolution. 5 (5): 1021–31. doi:10.1093/gbe/evt066. PMC 3673633. PMID 23666864.

== See also ==
- Biotechnology
