= Kimmen Sjölander =

American bio-engineer

- Education: University of California at Santa Cruz
- Known for: Computational biology
- Scientific career
- Workplaces: University of California, Berkeley, Celera Genomics, Molecular Applications Group

Kimmen Sjölander (née Warnow) is professor emerita at the University of California, Berkeley in the Department of Bioengineering. She is well known for her work on protein sequence analysis.

== Biography ==
Sjölander did both her undergraduate and graduate work at the University of California, Santa Cruz in the Department of Computer Science, earning a bachelor's degree in 1993 and a PhD in 1997 under the supervision of David Haussler. She was the chief scientist in the Molecular Applications Group from 1997-1999 (company co-founded by Michael Levitt) and then principal scientist in Protein Informatics at Celera Genomics from 1999-2001, where she was a member of the team (along with J. Craig Venter and Gene Myers) who assembled and annotated the Human Genome. She joined the faculty at the University of California, Berkeley in the Department of Bioengineering in 2001 as an assistant professor. She was tenured in 2006, and promoted to full professor in 2012.

== Awards ==
Sjölander received the NSF CAREER Award and the Presidential Early Career Award for Scientists and Engineers in 2003.

== Research ==
Sjölander is most well known for her work in phylogenomic methods for protein sequence analysis, including machine learning methods for functional site prediction and ortholog identification, and hidden Markov model (HMM) methods for protein structure prediction, functional subfamily and ortholog classification, remote homology detection, multiple sequence alignment, and phylogenetic tree estimation. Her algorithms were used in the functional annotation of the human genome at Celera Genomics, in the PhyloFacts bioinformatics databases and portals, and contributed to the ModBase database.

== Personal ==
Sjölander's twin sister Tandy Warnow is a professor of computer science at the University of Illinois Urbana–Champaign.

In 2018, Sjölander moved to Amsterdam with her husband. On a newsletter she shares blogs of her experience and photography in Amsterdam.

== Selected publications ==
- Venter, J Craig; et al. (2001), "The sequence of the human genome", Science, 291 (5507): 1304–1351, Bibcode:2001Sci...291.1304V, doi:10.1126/science.1058040, PMID 11181995.
- Krogh, Anders; Brown, Michael; Mian, Saira; Sjölander, Kimmen; Haussler, David (1994), "Hidden Markov models in computational biology: Applications to protein modeling", Journal of Molecular Biology, 235 (5): 1501–1531, doi:10.1006/jmbi.1994.1104, PMID 8107089.
- Sjolander, Kimmen; Karplus, Kevin; Brown, Michael; Hughey, Richard; Krogh, Anders; Mian, Saira; Haussler, David (1996), "Dirichlet mixtures: a method for improved detection of weak but significant protein sequence homology", Bioinformatics, 12 (4): 327–345, doi:10.1093/bioinformatics/12.4.327, PMID 8902360.
