= FamilyTreeDNA =

Commercial genetic testing company

- Industry: Genealogical DNA testing
- Founded: 2000
- Founder: Bennett Greenspan, Max Blankfeld, and Jim Warren
- Headquarters: Houston, Texas
- Area served: International
- Parent: MYDNA Inc.
- Website: www.familytreedna.com www.mydna.life

FamilyTreeDNA is a division of Gene by Gene, a commercial genetic testing company based in Houston, Texas. FamilyTreeDNA offers analysis of autosomal DNA, Y-DNA, and mitochondrial DNA to individuals for genealogical purpose. With a database of more than two million records, it is the most popular company worldwide for Y-DNA and mitochondrial DNA, and the fourth most popular for autosomal DNA. In Europe, it is the most common also for autosomal DNA. FamilyTreeDNA as a division of Gene by Gene were acquired by MYDNA, Inc., an Australian company, in January 2021.

== History ==
=== Concept and founding (2000–2002) ===
FamilyTreeDNA was founded based on an idea conceived by Bennett Greenspan, a lifelong entrepreneur and genealogy enthusiast. In 1999, Greenspan had entered semi-retirement and was working on his family history. He began work on his mother's Nitz lineage. When faced with a roadblock in his work, he remembered two cases of genetics being used to prove ancestry that had recently been covered by the media. These were a study by University of Arizona researchers showing that many Cohen men from both Ashkenazic and Sephardic groups share the same Y-chromosome and a study that showed that male descendants of a paternal uncle of US President Thomas Jefferson (who presumably shared his Y-chromosome) and male-line descendants of his freed slave Sally Hemings shared the same Y-chromosome and a recent common ancestry.

Greenspan had both Nitz cousins in California and had discovered someone in Argentina with the same ancestral surname and the same ancestral location in Eastern Europe. Wishing to use the same method of DNA comparison for his own genealogy, he contacted Dr. Michael Hammer at the University of Arizona. Greenspan discovered that academic labs did not offer testing directly to the public and that in general direct to consumer testing for genealogy was not commercially available either. Their conversation inspired him to start a company dedicated to using genetics to help solve genealogy mysteries.

It was early 2000 when Greenspan with his business partners Max Blankfeld and Jim Warren officially launched FamilyTreeDNA. Initially, the Arizona Research Labs at the University of Arizona performed all testing for FamilyTreeDNA. FamilyTreeDNA includes among its scientific staff, Dr. Michael Hammer (PhD), one of a team of scientists that first published on the Cohen Modal Haplotype in 1997 in the journal Nature.

FamilyTreeDNA began with a proof in concept group of twenty-four tests that returned results in January. The company began by offering 12 STR marker Y-chromosome tests much like those used in many scientific publications of the time in March 2000. FamilyTreeDNA became widely known for its Y-chromosome STR testing for the Cohen Modal Haplotype.

They added an interface by which genealogists could run surname research studies. The first person to create such a project through the FamilyTreeDNA site was Doug Mumma, who founded the Mumma project. Such projects can also focus on specific regions and niche populations.

=== Early testing (2000–2006) ===
The first tests offered by FamilyTreeDNA were Y-chromosome STR and mitochondrial DNA (mtDNA) tests like those used by published academic studies at the time.

FamilyTreeDNA's initial Y-chromosome tests were described as 11 marker tests. They eventually began to call this a 12 STR marker test as one of the STRS (DYS385) almost always had two copies. This they billed as a method to affirm or disprove a genealogical connection on the direct paternal line.

FamilyTreeDNA's first mtDNA tests were for HVR1 (hypervariable region 1) of the mtDNA. Eventually, they added a Plus test that tested for both HVR1 and HVR2.

In the early days, they did not confirm haplogroups for either mtDNA or Y-DNA.

=== Opening of the Genomics Research Center ===
In 2006, FamilyTreeDNA bought out the assets of DNA-Fingerprint, which was a German paternity testing company that offered à la carte testing to the genetic genealogy testing community. With this buyout, Thomas and Astrid Krahn, who had owned DNA-Fingerprint, moved to Houston, Texas, and helped open the Genomics Research Center.

The Genomics Research Center initially did testing for many of the same products that had been sold by DNA-Fingerprint. They began to offer individual and panels of Y-chromosome SNP tests using Sanger testing methods. They also offered the mtDNA full genome test and upgrades to it using the Sanger testing method.

Another product, the Walk Through the Y (WTY) test, offered "the chance to seek the discovery of new Y-chromosome SNPs".

Meanwhile, most testing continued to be done at the University of Arizona lab. The demand for additional test types led Greenspan and Blankfeld to move all testing to their own testing lab in Houston, Texas under the Genealogy by Genetics, Ltd. parent company.

=== Partnerships ===
Between 2007 and 2010, FamilyTreeDNA forged several new partnerships that allowed them to access additional international markets.

iGENEA

The first of FamilyTreeDNA's new partnerships was with the Switzerland-based iGENEA company. It was formed alongside the closing of DNA-Fingerprint and Thomas Krahn's helping open the Genomic Research Center in Houston. Their website is available in English, French, German, Italian, and Spanish.

African DNA

In late 2007, Henry Louis Gates created African DNA in partnership with FamilyTreeDNA to help promote genetic testing for personal ancestry among African Americans.

DNA Ancestry & Family Origin

DNA Ancestry & Family Origin is a genetic genealogy testing partnership between FamilyTreeDNA and Eastern Biotech & Life Sciences. Their website is available in both English and Arabic.

MyHeritage

In November 2008, a dynamic partnership with MyHeritage was launched, allowing users to incorporate DNA testing and advanced family tree technologies into their family history research. MyHeritage is a website offering online, mobile and software platforms for discovering, preserving and sharing family history worldwide.

=== Acquisition by MYDNA, Inc. (2021) ===
In January 2021 it was announced that MYDNA, Inc. a Melbourne, Australia, genomics company, had acquired Family Tree DNA and its parent company Gene by Gene. MYDNA, Inc has historically specialized in pharmacogenomics and nutrigenomics. Dr Lior Rauchberger commenced his role as CEO of MYDNA, Inc immediately. While Gene by Gene co-founders Bennett Greenspan and Max Blankfeld joined the MYDNA, Inc Board of Directors.

== DNA testing products ==
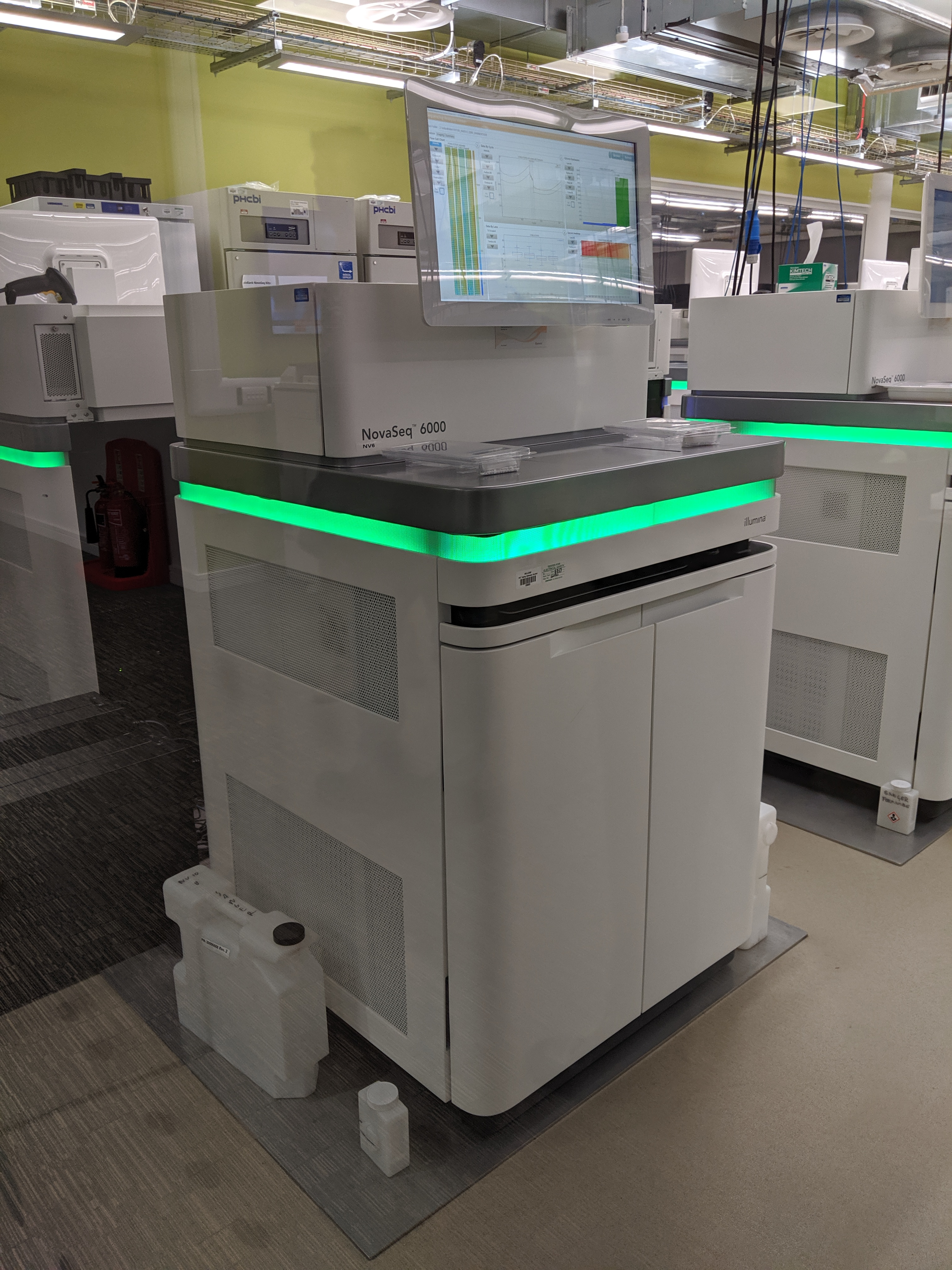
FamilyTreeDNA uses NovaSeq sequencing system by Illumina Inc. for its services. (System in different facility pictured.)

Services provided by FamilyTreeDNA are made in own laboratory meeting CLIA and CAP standards and they are based on various biotechnology products, including for example sequencing platform NovaSeq by Illumina, Inc.

=== Autosomal DNA testing ===
In May 2010, FamilyTreeDNA launched an autosomal microarray chip based DNA test. They called the new product Family Finder. The initial product used an Affymetrix microarray chip, but FamilyTreeDNA changed to the Illumina OmniExpress chip and retested all customers who had results from the Affymetrix chip for forward compatibility.

Family Finder allows customers to match relatives as distant as about fifth cousins. Family Finder also includes a component called myOrigins. The results of this test provide percentages of a DNA associated with general regions or specific ethnic groups (e.g. Western Europe, Asia, Jewish, Native American, etc.). Notably, unlike other testing companies, they chose to strip out markers for mendelian medical issues, mtDNA results, and Y-DNA SNP results.

=== Y-DNA testing ===
The company markets a range of Y-DNA tests. The Y-chromosome is inherited from father to son, so testers can discover relatives with the same patrilineage. In many cultures these relatives will often share the same surname, since surnames are also inherited father to son. These tests cover 37-111 STR markers depending on the test, and vary in price according to the number of markers covered. FTDNA introduced their "Big Y" test in 2013. Big Y tests approximately 15 million locations on the Y chromosome, looking for novel and shared SNPs. By the end of 2021, FTDNA had identified over 50,000 branches in the tree of all Y-DNA results.

=== mtDNA testing ===
FamilyTreeDNA also sells mtDNA testing, offering the choice of either a limited hypervariable region test, or a full sequence test of the entire mitochondrial DNA chromosome.

In February 2025 the new mitoTree was introduced. It uses the contribution of all the FamilyTreeDNA mtDNA testers and the development of the previous Phylotree from 2016 is considerable.

== Genographic Project ==
FamilyTreeDNA staff were instrumental in developing the Geno 2.0 Next Generation product for the second phase of the Genographic Project. Geno 2.0 samples for both public and scientific study were run at the Genomics Research Center in Houston, Texas (operated by FamilyTreeDNA's parent company, Gene by Gene, Ltd.) until 2016, when Geno 2.0 began utilizing Helix for DNA sequencing.

== Gene by Gene ==
In September 2012, Greenspan and Blankfeld restructured FamilyTreeDNA's parent company, Genealogy by Genetics, Ltd. This included their renaming Genealogy by Genetics, Ltd. as Gene by Gene, Ltd. After restructuring, the business consisted of four divisions, one of these being FamilyTreeDNA for genealogical DNA tests. It is Gene by Gene, Ltd. that operates the Genomics Research Center (GRC) lab in Houston, Texas. In January 2021, Gene by Gene was acquired by MYDNA Inc. Gene by Gene now works together with MYDNA improving genomics testing for a broad range of clinical and non-clinical services.

== Data policy and usage by law enforcement ==
In December 2018, FamilyTreeDNA changed its terms of service to allow law enforcement to use their service to identify suspects of "a violent crime" (defined as child abduction, sexual assault or homicide) or identify the remains of victims. The company confirmed it was working with the FBI on at least a handful of cases. As of March 2019, the company instituted a policy allowing its customers to opt out of law enforcement access to their genetic data. All customers were automatically opted in to such exposure except those living in the European Union who were opted out by default. Law enforcement officers will be required to go through a more rigorous process in order to access the database, while customers who opt out of allowing the FBI to access their data will still be able to search for possible relatives as before. “Users now have the ability to opt out of matching with DNA relatives whose accounts are flagged as being created to identify the remains of a deceased individual or a perpetrator of homicide or sexual assault, also referred to as Law Enforcement Matching (LEM),” the company wrote in an email to customers. In May 2019 FamilyTreeDNA prevented access to its Y-DNA database ysearch.org and its mtDNA data base mitosearch making it more difficult for law enforcement agencies to identify crime suspects. In August 2019, FamilyTreeDNA reported that about 50 law enforcement agencies had submitted DNA samples for matching and that almost 150 cases had been submitted. By spring 2020, only around 3% of about 2 million users have opted out. By August 2020, the company helped solve at least 27 cases.

=== List of arrest or identifications made with FamilyTreeDna ===
- In January 2019, California police arrested Kevin Konther for the brutal rape of a nine-year-old girl in Lake Forest 1995 and a 31-year-old woman at Mission Viejo, California in 1998 and said they had used FamilyTreeDNA services and genetic genealogy techniques to help identify him. Konther has an identical twin brother, and the DNA profile had initially implicated both men, but further detective investigation led authorities to release the brother and focus on Konther as their main suspect. He was also accused of molesting a 12-year-old girl between January 2002 and December 2003. In February 2023, Konther was found guilty of both rapes as well as committing lewd acts on a girlfriend’s daughter when she was 8 or 9 years old at the couple’s homes in Huntington Beach and Highland. In January 2024, Konther was sentenced to 140 years in prison.
- In February 2019, FamilyTreeDNA helped police with the arrest of James Neal for the July 6, 1973 abduction and murder by strangulation of 11-year-old schoolgirl Linda O'Keefe in Newport Beach, California as well as multiple sexual assaults against other children. He pleaded not guilty and faced a maximum sentence of 82 years to life in state prison if convicted. However Neal died while in custody in July 2020 from an illness before he could be tried.
- In February 2019, Jerry Westrom was arrested as the suspect behind the 1993 murder of Jeanne Ann Childs in Minneapolis, Minnesota. In an interview after his arrest, Westrom denied being in the apartment. He said he did not know the victim, and said he did not have sex with any women in Minneapolis in 1993. When confronted with the DNA evidence, he told investigators he had no idea why his DNA would be present at that scene. In August 2022, Westrom was convicted and in September, he was sentenced to life in prison with 30 years before parole.
- In April 2019, Law Enforcement working with Family Tree DNA Positively identified the remains of two young women found in oil fields in 1986 and 1991 in an area known as the "Texas Killing Fields" near League City, Texas. They were 30-year-old Audrey Lee Cook and 34-year-old mother of two Donna Prudhomme.
- In May 2019, Christopher VanBuskirk was arrested in Goodyear Arizona for the sexual assaults of six women at knife-point from 1995 to 2004 in San Diego and Riverside Counties, California. He had been identified with the help of the FBI Forensic Genetic Genealogy Team and Family Tree DNA. VanBuskirk originally pled not guilty to the crimes and faced 190 years to life in prison, however changed his plea to guilty in December 2019, and was sentenced on February 20, 2020, to 50 years to life in prison. Vanbskirk is currently incarcerated in the California Institution for Men and is currently eligible for parole in February 2038.
- In August 2019, Ralph Bortree was arrested in Ohio for a July 31, 1993, rape and attempted murder of a 19-year-old woman. the DNA profile was also matched to a May 23, 1992 kidnapping and rape of another 19-year-old woman. Other evidence links him to two similar attacks on women on July 22, 1993 and May 24, 1995. Bortree cannot be charged with rape, kidnapping or attempted kidnapping or rape due to the states 20 year statute of limitations for those crimes so the prosecution only charged him with one count of attempted murder. The defense argued that the statue has expired for that offense as well. However the judge ruled against the motion and Bortree was found guilty of Attempted Aggravated Murder at trial in November 2020 and was sentenced to 11 years in prison on December 18. Bortree was imprisoned in the Richland Correctional Institution. In November 2022, the state Supreme Court overturned his conviction, ruling that the statute of limitations had indeed expired by the time of his arrest.
- In September 2019, Donald Perea was posthumously identified as the 1981 rapist and murderer of 18-year old Jeannie Moore in Jefferson county Colorado. Perea was previously convicted of a different rape that also took place in 1981. He could not be arrested due to his death in 2012.
- In September 2019, Mark Douglas Burns was identified and arrested as a suspect in nine rapes that took place in Wyoming and Utah between 1991 and 2001. According to Barbara Rae-Venter the case took over a year and a half and was one of the most difficult ones to solve as Mark was adopted and the building where his records were located burned to the ground. Burns was also later connected to the 2001 Wyoming murder of 28-year-old Sue Ellen Higgins, Burns initially pled not guilty but later changed his plea to guilty. In April 2020, Burns was sentenced to a total of 242 years in prison for the rapes and in December 2020, Burns was sentenced to life in prison without parole for the murder of Sue Ellen Higgins. Burns is imprisoned in the Utah State Prison.
- In February 2020, Michael Green was arrested for the 1985 murder of 54-year old Jane Hylton in El Dorado Hills, California. Green was initially not named since he was a juvenile at the time of the murder. Ricky Davis was previously convicted of the murder and had been sentenced to 16 years to life of which he had served 14 years when he was exonerated and the new suspect arrested. Davis is the first person in California, and the second in the United States, to be exonerated due to the use of genetic genealogy. Christopher Tapp, a man in Idaho was convicted for the 1996 rape and murder of Angie Dodge but was exonerated with the help of genetic genealogy in 2019 after spending 22 years in jail. Green pled guilty and in September 2022, Green was sentenced to 15 years-to-life in prison.
- In February 2020, Deborah Riddle O' Conner was arrested for the murder of a "Baby Michael" in Raleigh, North Carolina in 1999. In August 2021, O’Connor pled guilty to second-degree murder and was sentenced to 12 years in prison.
- In April 2020, James Raymond Taylor was identified as the Aug. 18, 1963 rapist and murderer of 16-year old Margaret "Peggy" Beck near Deckers, Colorado.
- In May 2020, Angelo Alleano Jr., a firefighter, was arrested for four burglaries and sexual assaults that occurred between 2001 and 2008 in Manchester and Vernon, Connecticut. In June 2022, Alleano pled guilty to the charges against him. In September, he was sentenced to 25 years in prison.
- In May 2020, Christopher Lovrien was charged with the murder of Mark Dribin in Portland, Oregon in 1999. Lovrien is now also being charged with the murder of Kenneth Griffin, who had gone missing on February 1, 2020 by authorities searching a shed at Lovrien’s home several weeks after his arrest found Griffins dismembered remains. In March, 2024, Lovrien was sentenced to life with the possibility of parole after 45 years after pleading guilty to the murders.
- In July 2020, Lesa Lopez was arrested in Salida, California for the murder of her newborn baby boy who was found dead on May 15, 1988 in Castro Valley. In May 2023, Lopez pled no contest to the charges and was sentenced to 6 years in prison.
- In October 2020, a skull and other remains of a man found in a wooded area in Giddings, Texas were identified as James L. Hamm. The DNA Doe Project had been investigating the case since June 2019, and had uploaded his DNA to both FamilyTreeDNA and GEDMatch. Hamm's matches were notably much poorer on GEDMatch, and Hamm's brother, Eugene, was found on FamilyTreeDNA in June 2020. After DNA comparison, the remains in Texas were conclusively identified as Hamm.
- In February 2021, David Dwayne Anderson was arrested for the August 4, 1981 Murder of Sylvia Quayle in Cherry Hills Village, Colorado. In June 2022, Anderson was found guilty of his offenses and in August, Anderson was sentenced to life in prison with 20 years before parole.
- In November 2021, Kenneth Robert Stough, Jr was arrested for the murder of 31-year old Terence Paquette who was found stabbed to death at the Lil' Champ convenience store n Orlando, Florida in 1996. In August 2023, Stough was found guilty and sentenced to life in prison.
- In May 2022, Jennifer Lynn Matter, of Belvidere Township, Minnesota was arrested and charged with second-degree murder with intent, not premeditated, and second-degree murder without intent for the murders of her newborn daughter who was found dead in the Mississippi River in 1999 and her newborn son who was found dead in Lake Pepin in 2003. In January 2023, Matter pled guilty to second-degree intentional murder for her sons death and in April, Matter was sentenced to over 27 years in prison.
- In November 2022, Douglas L. Weber was arrested for the January 7, 1996 kidnapping and rape of a teenaged woman in Larkin Township, Michigan. Weber pled guilty in December 2023 and pled guilty third-degree criminal sexual conduct and in March 2024, was sentenced to 15 years in prison.

== See also ==
- Genetic genealogy
  - Ancient DNA
  - Genealogical DNA test
  - Genetic genealogy
  - Human mitochondrial genetics
  - Phylogenetic tree
  - Short tandem repeat
  - Single-nucleotide polymorphism
- Test types
  - DNA microarray
  - DNA sequencing
  - Polymerase chain reaction
  - Sanger sequencing
- Test manufactures
  - Affymetrix
  - Applied Biosystems
  - Illumina
- Genetic genealogy and anthro-genetics companies
  - 23andMe
  - deCODEme
  - GEDmatch
  - GeneTree
  - Genographic Project
  - International Society of Genetic Genealogy (ISOGG)
  - Sorenson Molecular Genealogy Foundation (SMGF)
