= UC Santa Cruz Genomics Institute =

Public research institution in California

- Formation: 2014
- Location: Santa Cruz, California, U.S.
- Research Type: Basic (non-clinical)
- Fields of Research: Genomics, Bioinformatics, Computational Biology, Big Data Analytics, Data Sharing, Paleogenomics, Nanopore Sequencing, Cancer and Disease Research
- Director: David Haussler, Founding Scientific Director
- Affiliations: University of California, Santa Cruz, Jack Baskin School of Engineering
- Website: genomics.ucsc.edu

The UC Santa Cruz Genomics Institute is a public research institution based in the Jack Baskin School of Engineering at the University of California, Santa Cruz. The Genomics Institute's scientists and engineers work on a variety of projects related to genome sequencing, computational biology, large data analytics, and data sharing. The institute also maintains a number of software tools used by researchers worldwide, including the UCSC Genome Browser, Dockstore, and the Xena Browser.

== History ==
The UC Santa Cruz Genomics Institute was formally organized in 2014 by Dr. David Haussler, whose involvement in the Human Genome Project helped build UC Santa Cruz's strength in sequencing, analyzing, and displaying huge volumes of data.

UC Santa Cruz joined the Human Genome Project's consortium in 1999, when the public project was speeding up its efforts because of concern that a corporation might complete the human genome sequence first and patent key parts of it.

Haussler, then a member of the Computer Science Department at UC Santa Cruz, recognized the need for a computational solution to align consortium's 400,000 fragments of DNA into a coherent sequence. He enlisted the help of biology graduate student Jim Kent, who was able to write a code that assembled the DNA sequencing data from the international consortium just days before a competing corporate team created their first assembly. UC Santa Cruz posted the first human genome sequence on the internet on July 7, 2000, to make it freely available to the public. Kent then immediately began to assemble the UCSC Genome Browser to allow researchers to view the assembled DNA sequence in terms of genes and chromosomes. This tool, and other browsers that UC Santa Cruz has created over the last two decades, continue to be maintained by the Genomics Institute.

In 2004, UC Santa Cruz created a Department of Biomolecular Engineering, which housed many of the university's genomics efforts until the formal Genomics Institute was organized in 2014.

== Research ==
The stated mission of the UC Santa Cruz Genomics Institute is to openly share genomic data and speed its incorporation into health and conservation efforts. Its research is focused on three broad areas: 1) developing and improving tools for DNA and RNA sequencing and for securely sharing large quantities of genomic data 2) using genomic data to improve human health, and 3) collecting and sequencing genomic data that can be used for environmental conservation.

Affiliates of the Genomics Institute have played significant roles in large-scale consortium sequencing projects like GENCODE, the Vertebrate Genome Project, Pan-Cancer Initiative, Human Cell Atlas, and the Human Genome Reference Program to create a more complete and diverse reference genome. One of the institute's Associate Directors, Karen Miga, recently co-led the Telomere to Telomere consortium that finally completed a full, gapless sequence of the human genome.

Several of the Institute's major initiatives focus on disease and pathogen research. These include Treehouse Childhood Cancer Initiative, the UCSC Center for Live Cell Genomics, the BRCA Exchange for breast cancer, and a pathogen genomics team that has provided tools used by the CDC and other health organizations to track the mutations and spread of the COVID-19 virus.

The Genomics Institute is also a partner of the CALeDNA program to document and sequence biodiversity in California and hosts a number of related projects in conservation genomics.

Government and private sponsors for the Genomics Institute include the National Institute of Health, the National Science Foundation, the California Department of Public Health, St. Baldrick's Foundation, Simons Foundation, Keck Foundation, Howard Hughes Medical Institute, Schmidt Futures, and the Chan Zuckerberg Initiative, among others. It frequently engages in collaborations with industry partners, some of which have included Google Health and Amazon Web Services.

== Training Programs and Outreach ==
The Genomics Institute at UC Santa Cruz organizes a number of programs to train young researchers in coding and bioinformatics, including its short, intensive courses for community college students, summer coding program for incoming students, a Research Mentoring and Internship Program to train undergraduates in genomic science, and a Treehouse Undergraduate Bioinformatics Intensive program that introduces students to using bioinformatics in cancer research. It also collaborates with high school classrooms to bring remote experimentation to classrooms that are not normally equipped for such experimentation.

The Graduate Program in Genome Sciences combines rigorous training in the disciplines that are fundamental to genome science, including computer science, molecular biology and genetics, and statistics, with hands-on technical training for students.

== Organizational Structure ==
The UC Santa Cruz Genomics Institute is an interdivisional, technology driven institution formally characterized as an Organized Research Unit of the University of California, Santa Cruz in 2019. This designation allows it to conduct multidisciplinary and collaborative research in a more supportive manner within the university. The institute is made up of approximately 150 researchers and staff.

== Facilities ==
In 2019, the Genomics Institute moved its headquarters to the UC Santa Cruz Westside Research Park located at 2300 Delaware Ave. Santa Cruz, CA 95060, which is also the home of its diagnostic lab, the Colligan Clinical and Diagnostic Laboratory. Institute affiliates also maintain labs on the UC Santa Cruz main campus.
