= Gene by Gene =

Commercial genetic testing company

Gene by Gene, Ltd.
- Type: Ltd
- Industry: Biotechnology
- Founded: April 2000
- Founder: Bennett Greenspan and Max Blankfeld
- Headquarters: Houston, TX, United States
- Products: Genetic tests
- Parent: myDNA Inc.
- Website: https://genebygene.com/ www.mydna.life

Gene by Gene is a commercial genetic testing company based in Houston, Texas. The company was owned by Bennett Greenspan and Max Blankfeld, and was the parent company of Family Tree DNA. In January 2021, Gene by Gene was acquired by US based parent company myDNA Inc. Gene by Gene and Australia company myDNA Life Private Ltd. are both subsidiaries of the parent company, myDNA Inc. The current Chief Executive Officer of myDNA Inc. is, Dr. Lior Rauchberger.

== History ==
Genealogy by Genetics, Ltd. was formed in 2000 with the creation of FamilyTreeDNA. In September 2012, Greenspan and Blankfeld restructured the company and renamed it Gene by Gene, Ltd. After restructuring, the business comprises four divisions; DNA DTC, DNA Findings, DNA Traits, and Family Tree DNA.

=== FamilyTreeDNA ===
Family Tree DNA was the first commercial company to develop DNA testing for genealogical purposes, and it has been operational since April 2000.

=== The Genomics Research Center ===
Family Tree DNA originally partnered with the University of Arizona for testing. However, Greenspan and Blankfeld started their own testing laboratory, the Houston-based Genomics Research Center (GRC), under the Genealogy by Genetics, Ltd. parent company in 2007. As of November 2012, the GRC processed more than five million discrete DNA tests for over 700,000 individuals and organizations. All public participation kits from the Genographic Project are currently processed at the GRC laboratory. In April 2013, Gene by Gene announced it had signed an agreement with the MD Anderson Cancer Center to provide instruction, training, and supervision to the center's undergraduate molecular genetic technology students.

=== Additional divisions ===
With the opening of the GRC, Greenspan and Blankfeld formed additional business units between 2008 and 2012 under the Genealogy by Genetics company to sell non-genealogical genetic tests. They launched DNA Traits in 2008. In an interview in 2008, Greenspan said "Mendelian disorders are genealogy—we either have had a disaster in our families and therefore we know that someone carries the mutation, or they are hidden and depending upon whom we marry they might create a personal disaster for the family who is a carrier". DNA Traits offers Clinical Laboratory Improvement Amendments (CLIA)-regulated health diagnostic tests to identify genetic disorders and susceptibility to inherited diseases and other characteristics, and serves certified medical professionals and researchers. DNA Findings offers certified relationship tests, including paternity and siblingship tests. DNA DTC was created to serve the Direct-To-Consumer (DTC) market and institutional clients such as life science companies, contract research organizations, academic institutions and public-sector research facilities.

=== myDNA, Inc. and Gene by Gene acquisition ===
In January 2021 it was announced that myDNA Inc., a genomics company headquartered in Melbourne, Australia, had acquired Gene by Gene. MyDNA, Inc. also has an Australian subsidiary myDNA Life, Private Ltd., that has historically specialized in pharmacogenomics and nutrigenomics. Dr. Lior Rauchberger commenced his role as CEO of the newly incorporated myDNA, Inc. effective immediately. While Gene by Gene co-founders Bennett Greenspan and Max Blankfeld joined the myDNA, Inc. Board of Directors.

== See also ==
- 23andMe
- Mygene
- Myriad genetics
