= John P. Blewett =

Canadian-American physicist

John Paul Blewett (12 April 1910, Toronto, Ontario – 7 April 2000, Chapel Hill, North Carolina) was a Canadian-American physicist, known as "a key figure in the development of particle accelerators".

== Biography ==
At the University of Toronto, Blewett graduated with a bachelor's degree in physics and mathematics in 1932 and a master's degree in physics in 1933. He received his Ph.D. from Princeton University in 1936. An abridged version of his doctoral dissertation was published in Physical Review. On the 9th of June 1936, he married Myrtle Hildred Hunt, who was also an accelerator physicist. He spent a postdoctoral year at the Cavendish Laboratory, where he worked under the supervision of Ernest Rutherford, Mark Oliphant, and others.

From 1937 to 1946, Blewett worked in the research laboratory of the General Electric Co in Schenectady, New York. During that period, Donald Kerst built a 20-MeV betatron at GE in 1941, and, in 1945, Ernest Charlton and William Westendorp built a record-breaking 100-MeV betatron at GE, achieving by far the highest particle energy in the world. About the same time, Blewett came across a paper by Russian physicists Dimitri Iwanenko and Isaak Ya. Pomeranchuk, in which they pointed out that high-energy electron beams circulating in a betatron would lose some energy by radiation. After performing some calculations, Blewett concluded that the radiation would indeed be significant and would make it difficult to build machines for higher energy. He predicted that the radiation would cause the orbit of the new betatron to shrink—and indeed it was found to shrink by precisely the amount Blewett had calculated. This was the first observation of what is now known as synchrotron radiation.

In 1945 Blewett visited Berkeley Radiation Laboratory and learned about Edwin McMillan's ideas for building a new synchrotron. Blewett and colleagues at General Electric used McMillan's new synchrotron idea to build a 70-meV synchrotron, which his colleagues completed in 1947. However, shortly before the synchrotron became operational, Blewett and his first wife Hildred Blewett moved in January 1947 from Schenectady to Long Island, where both had jobs at Brookhaven National Laboratory (BNL). When the Blewetts arrived at BNL, security authorities of the Atomic Energy Commission barred them from going to work for six months because of a false guilt-by-association concern raised against John P. Blewett.

John P. Blewett's participated in the BNL's design and construction of a new particle accelerator called the Cosmotron, which could accelerate protons to a kinetic energy of about 3 GeV (three billion electron volts) — putting the protons into the energy range of cosmic rays. He was in charge of the design and construction of the magnet and the radio-frequency accelerating system and made an important innovation by using ferrite in the accelerating cavities. He led a group of BNL physicists who introduced the alternating-gradient or “strong-focusing” method, which was essential for the Cosmotron to become in 1952 the world's first billion-volt particle accelerator.

In 1952 a multi-national group of European physicists representing CERN invited John and Hildred Blewett join in the effort create CERN's proton synchrotron. The Blewetts went to Bergen, Norway, where they contributed to the synchrotron's initial design and helped in the move to Geneva, Switzerland, where lab construction began in late 1953. In early 1954 John and Hildred returned to work at BNL, where construction of the Alternating Gradient Synchrotron (AGS) was beginning. G. Kenneth Green was put in charge and John P. Blewett was his deputy. In 1960, the AGS attained a 33-GeV proton beam, setting another world record for accelerator energy. John Blewett and Luke Chia-Liu Yuan investigated the possibilities of proton synchrotrons that might reach 1000 GeV — such investigations eventually led to the Relativistic Heavy Ion Collider.

John Blewett and his first wife divorced in the early 1960s. He married Joan Nelson Warnow on June 8, 1983, in San Francisco. Joan Warnow-Blewett was an archivist for the American Institute of Physics.

Blewett was the coauthor, with M. Stanley Livingston, of Particle Accelerators, published by McGraw-Hill in 1962. In 1970 Blewett became the founding editor-in-chief of the journal Particle Accelerators, published by Gordon & Breach.

He was the deputy chair of BNL's accelerator department until 1973 and then, until he retired in 1978, was a special assistant to the director. In retirement John Blewett participated in creating the proposal for BNL to build the National Synchrotron Light Source. He also was a consultant for Taiwan's National Synchrotron Radiation Research Center.

John P. Blewett was elected in 1941 a Fellow of the American Physical Society (APS) and in 1980 a Fellow of the American Association for the Advancement of Science (AAAS). In 1993 he received the Robert R. Wilson Prize from the APS.

== Selected publications ==
- Blewett, J. P.; Jones, Ernest J. (1936). "Filament Sources of Positive Ions". Physical Review. 50 (5): 464–468. Bibcode:1936PhRv...50..464B. doi:10.1103/PhysRev.50.464.
- Blewett, John P. (1939). "The Properties of Oxide-Coated Cathodes. I". Journal of Applied Physics. 10 (10): 668–679. Bibcode:1939JAP....10..668B. doi:10.1063/1.1707247.
- Blewett, John P. (1939). "The Properties of Oxide-Coated Cathodes. II". Journal of Applied Physics. 10 (12): 831–848. Bibcode:1939JAP....10..831B. doi:10.1063/1.1707270.
- Blewett, J. P.; Liebhafsky, H. A.; Hennelly, E. F. (1939). "The Vapor Pressure and Rate of Evaporation of Barium Oxide". The Journal of Chemical Physics. 7 (7): 478–484. Bibcode:1939JChPh...7..478B. doi:10.1063/1.1750476.
- Blewett, John P.; Ramo, Simon (1940). "High Frequency Behavior of a Space Charge Rotating in a Magnetic Field". Physical Review. 57 (7): 635–641. Bibcode:1940PhRv...57..635B. doi:10.1103/PhysRev.57.635.
- Blewett, John P. (1946). "Radiation Losses in the Induction Electron Accelerator". Physical Review. 69 (3–4): 87–95. Bibcode:1946PhRv...69...87B. doi:10.1103/PhysRev.69.87.
- Livingston, M. S.; Blewett, J. P.; Green, G. K.; Haworth, L. J. (1950). "Design Study for a Three-Bev Proton Accelerator". Review of Scientific Instruments. 21 (1): 7–22. Bibcode:1950RScI...21....7L. doi:10.1063/1.1745428.
- Blewett, J. P. (1952). "Radial Focusing in the Linear Accelerator". Physical Review. 88 (5): 1197–1199. Bibcode:1952PhRv...88.1197B. doi:10.1103/PhysRev.88.1197.
- Blewett, J. P. (1956). "The Proton Synchrotron". Reports on Progress in Physics. 19 (1): 37–79. Bibcode:1956RPPh...19...37B. doi:10.1088/0034-4885/19/1/302. S2CID 250737283.
- Maglić, Bogdan C.; Blewett, John P.; Colleraine, Anthony P.; Harrison, W. Craig (1971). "Fusion Reactions in Self-Colliding Orbits". Physical Review Letters. 27 (14): 909–912. Bibcode:1971PhRvL..27..909M. doi:10.1103/PhysRevLett.27.909.
- Blewett, J.P. (1971). "200 GeV intersecting storage accelerators". Proceedings of the 8th International Conference on High-energy Accelerators. 28: 501–504.
- Grand, P.; Batchelor, K.; Blewett, J. P.; Goland, A.; Gurinsky, D.; Kukkonen, J.; Snead, C. L. (1976). "An Intense Li(d,n) Neutron Radiation Test Facility for Controlled Thermonuclear Reactor Materials Testing". Nuclear Technology. 29 (3): 327–336. Bibcode:1976NucTe..29..327G. doi:10.13182/NT76-A31598.
- Blewett, John P.; Chasman, R. (1977). "Orbits and fields in the helical wiggler". Journal of Applied Physics. 48 (7): 2692–2698. Bibcode:1977JAP....48.2692B. doi:10.1063/1.324119.
- Blewett, John P. (1988). "Synchrotron radiation — 1873 to 1947". Nuclear Instruments and Methods in Physics Research Section A: Accelerators, Spectrometers, Detectors and Associated Equipment. 266 (1–3): 1–9. Bibcode:1988NIMPA.266....1B. doi:10.1016/0168-9002(88)90349-X.
- Blewett, John P. (1998). "Synchrotron Radiation – Early History". Journal of Synchrotron Radiation. 5 (3): 135–139. Bibcode:1998JSynR...5..135B. doi:10.1107/S0909049597043306. PMID 15263467.
