= Hildred Blewett =

Canadian physicist (1911–2004)

M. Hildred Blewett
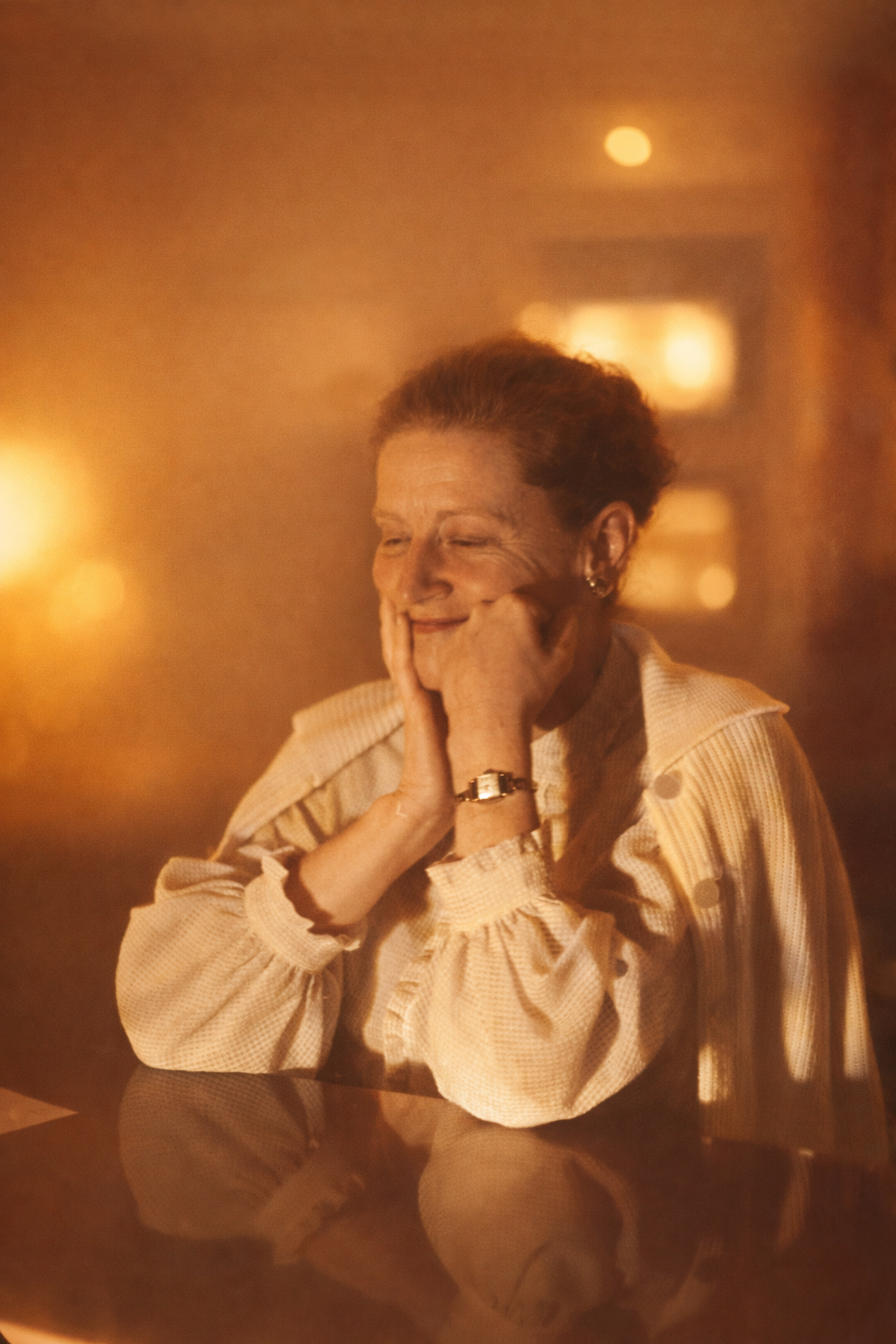
- Born: Myrtle Hildred Hunt; 28 May 1911; Ontario, Canada
- Died: 13 June 2004 (aged 93); Vancouver, Canada
- Education: University of Toronto (B.A); Cornell University (Ph.D.)
- Spouse: John P. Blewett
- Scientific career
- Fields: Accelerator physics
- Institutions: General Electric; Brookhaven National Laboratory; Argonne National Laboratory; CERN
- Doctoral advisor: Hans Bethe

Myrtle Hildred Blewett (born Myrtle Hildred Hunt; 28 May 1911 – 13 June 2004) was a Canadian accelerator physicist.

== Early life and education ==
Blewett was born on 28 May 1911 in Toronto, Ontario. She graduated from the University of Toronto in 1935 with a BA in physics and mathematics. In 1938, Blewett joined Cornell University as a graduate student, with Hans Bethe as her thesis supervisor. However, due to the United States entrance to the second world war, her thesis work remained incomplete.

== Career ==
Blewett started her career at General Electric, where she devised a technique for controlling smoke pollution from factory chimneys in the 1940s. She and her husband John Blewett were part of the initial team at Brookhaven National Laboratory. In the early 1950s Blewett contributed to the design of CERN’s first high-energy accelerator, the Proton Synchrotron, while also working on a similar machine proposed for Brookhaven. She then worked at Argonne National Laboratory before finally joining CERN in 1969. At CERN, Blewett worked in the Intersecting Storage Rings (ISR). She ran the finances of that division and was secretary of the ISR Committee (ISRC).

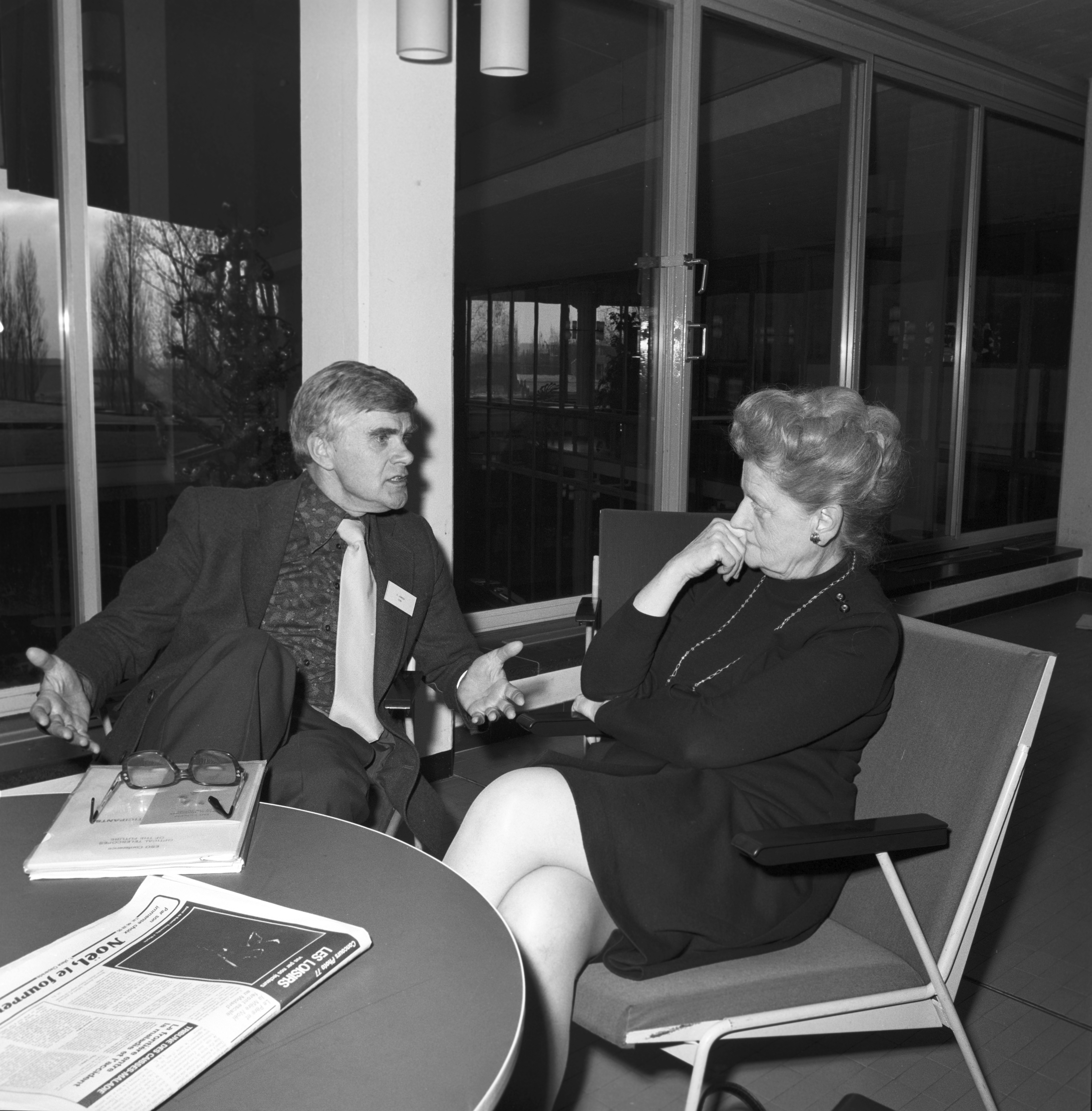
Hildred Blewett (front) with Kjell Johnsen at CERN.

Following her retirement from CERN in 1977, Blewett retired to Vancouver. She died on 13 June 2004, and was commemorated by CERN colleagues Maria Fidecaro and Christine Sutton. She left much of her estate to the American Physical Society, founding the Blewett Scholarship for women physicists who return to the field after a break in their careers.

== Personal life ==
Blewett married John Blewett in 1936, who was also an accelerator physicist, and later divorced in 1960s.
