= Global Alliance for Genomics and Health =

Genomics research consortium

The Global Alliance for Genomics and Health (GA4GH) is an international standards development organisation for responsibly collecting, storing, analyzing, and sharing genomic data in order to enable an "internet of genomics". GA4GH was founded in 2013.

GA4GH is founded on the Framework for the Responsible Sharing of Genomic and Health-related Data, which is based on the human right to benefit from scientific advances.

== Organization ==
GA4GH maintained by four Host Institutions (Wellcome Sanger Institute, Broad Institute, Ontario Institute for Cancer Research, McGill University's Victor Phillip Dahdaleh Institute of Genomic Medicine, and the European Bioinformatics Institute). Heidi Rehm is the current GA4GH chair Peter Goodhand is the Chief Executive Officer, Sasha Siegel is the Chief Product Officer, and Angela Page is the Chief Strategy and Engagement Officer. Kathryn North is the current Vice Chair and Ewan Birney is the past chair.

Organizational members of the alliance include:

- Alberta Precision Laboratories
- BioBox Analytics
- British Columbia Institute of Technology (BCIT)
- Canada Health Infoway
- Canadian Cancer Society
- Canadian Institutes of Health Research (CIHR)
- Canadian Organization for Rare Disorders (CORD)
- Canadian Distributed Infrastructure for Genomics (CanDIG)
- Centre of Genomics and Policy
- CHU Sainte-Justine Research Center
- Coral Health Research & Discovery
- DNAstack
- Gene42
- GeneYouIn
- GenoLogics Life Sciences Software
- Genome British Columbia
- Genome Canada
- Genome Québec
- GenomeArc
- Huntington Society of Canada
- Indoc Research
- International Cancer Genome Consortium
- International Human Epigenome Consortium
- International Society for Biological and Environmental Repositories
- McGill University
- MitoCanada Foundation
- Montreal Neurological Institute and Hospital (The Neuro)
- Mount Sinai Hospital
- Newtopia
- Ontario Brain Institute
- Ontario Institute for Cancer Research
- Ontario Personalized Medicine Network
- Pentavere Research Group
- PHEMI Systems
- Public Population Project in Genomics and Society (P3G)
- Roche
- SickKids
- Lunenfeld-Tanenbaum Research Institute
- Sightline Innovation
- Simon Fraser University
- SolverGen
- Streamline Genomics
- Sunnybrook Research Institute
- Université Laval
- University of British Columbia
- University of Toronto
- University of Waterloo

=== Funding ===
GA4GH is supported by a "Funder's Forum" composed of organizations whose funding commitments exceed USD $200,000 annually, for at least three years. Forum members include:

- Canadian Institutes of Health Research
- Genome Canada
- National Institute for Health Research
- National Institutes of Health
  - National Cancer Institute
  - National Heart, Lung and Blood Institute
  - National Human Genome Research Institute
  - Office of Data Science Strategy
  - Office of the Director of the National Institutes of Health / All of Us research project
- UK Research and Innovation
  - Medical Research Council
- Wellcome Trust

=== Activities ===
All GA4GH standards are developed by six technical and two foundational "Work Streams" in collaboration with real-world genomic data initiatives called "Driver Projects."

==== GA4GH Work Streams ====
1. Regulatory and Ethics (foundational)
2. Data Security (foundational)
3. Artificial Intelligence (foundational)
4. Federated Analytics
5. Clinical & Phenotypic Data Capture
6. Data Use and Researcher Identities
7. Data Discovery
8. Genomic Knowledge Standards

==== GA4GH Driver Projects ====
1. All of US Research Program
2. Australian Genomics
3. BRCA Challenge
4. Canadian Distributed Infrastructure for Genomics (CanDig)
5. Clinical Genome Resource (ClinGen)
6. ELIXIR Beacon
7. The European Nucleotide Archive, European Variation Archive, and European Genome-phenome Archive at EMBL-EBI
8. EUCANCan
9. European Joint Programme on Rare Diseases
10. Genomics England
11. Human Cell Atlas
12. Human Heredity and Health in Africa (H3Africa)
13. International Cancer Genome Consortium - ARGO
14. Matchmaker Exchange
15. The Monarch Initiative
16. National Cancer Institute Data Commons Framework (NCI DCF) and Genomic Data Commons (NCI GDC)
17. Trans-Omics for Precision Medicine (TOPMed)
18. Variant Interpretation for Cancer Consortium (VICC)

== Genomic Beacon API ==
The Genomic Beacon API is a standard of GA4GH. The "Beacon" protocol was originally proposed as a simple standard for the discovery of genomic sequence variants using federated queries against a potentially large number of genomic databases with implicit security provided through the use of limited query parameters and restriction to Boolean responses. In the version 2 of the protocol the API supports "phenoclinical" queries (e.g. combining parameters for genomic variant discovery with diagnostic or technical parameters) as well as responses containing versions of the matched records.
