= Tandy Warnow =

American computer scientist

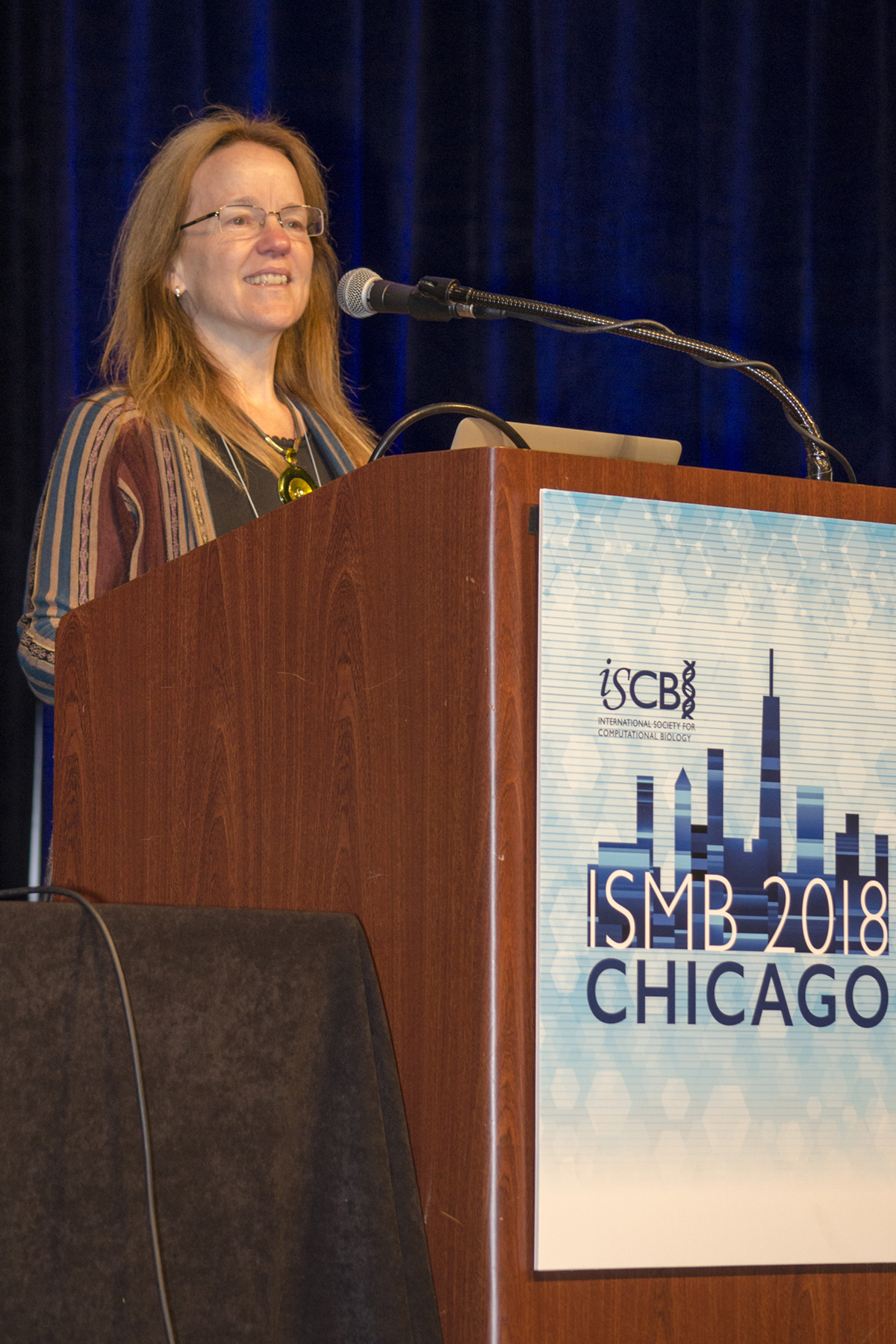
- Tandy Warnow speaking at the Intelligent Systems for Molecular Biology (ISMB) conference in 2018
- Born: Tandy Jo Warnow
- Education: University of California, Berkeley (BS, PhD)
- Spouse: George Chacko
- Children: 2
- Awards: David and Lucile Packard Foundation Fellow (1996); Radcliffe Institute for Advanced Study Fellow (2003); John Simon Guggenheim Foundation Fellow (2010); ACM Fellow (2015); ISCB Fellow (2017); AAAS Fellow (2021); ISCB Senior Scientist Award (2024); American Academy of Arts and Sciences Elected Member (2026)
- Scientific career
- Fields: Computer Science; Computational Biology; Phylogenetics; Metagenomics; Multiple Sequence Alignment
- Workplaces: University of Illinois at Urbana–Champaign; University of Pennsylvania; University of Texas
- Thesis: Combinatorial algorithms for constructing phylogenetic trees (1991)
- Doctoral advisor: Eugene Lawler
- Other academic advisors: Michael Waterman; Simon Tavare
- Doctoral students: Luay Nakhleh
- Website: tandy.cs.illinois.edu

Tandy Warnow is an American computer scientist and Grainger Distinguished Chair in Engineering at the University of Illinois at Urbana–Champaign. She is known for her work on the reconstruction of evolutionary trees, both in biology and in historical linguistics, and also for multiple sequence alignment methods.

== Biography ==
Warnow did both her undergraduate and graduate studies in mathematics at the University of California, Berkeley, earning a bachelor's degree in 1984 and a PhD in 1991 under the supervision of Eugene Lawler. The other members of her dissertation committee were Richard Karp, Manuel Blum, Dan Gusfield, and David Gale.

== Research and career ==
After postdoctoral research at the University of Southern California from 1991 to 1992 (postdoctoral supervisors Michael Waterman and Simon Tavare) and at Sandia National Laboratories in Albuquerque from 1992 to 1993, she took a faculty position at the University of Pennsylvania, where she remained until moving in 1999 to the University of Texas. In 2014, Warnow joined the faculty of the University of Illinois at Urbana–Champaign (UIUC), where she is the Grainger Distinguished Chair in Engineering and Associate Director of the Siebel School of Computing and Data Science. Warnow has courtesy appointments in the Departments of Animal Biology, Bioengineering, Electrical and Computer Engineering, Entomology, Mathematics, Plant Biology, and Statistics.

In 1995, research by Warnow, Donald Ringe, and Ann Taylor at the University of Pennsylvania based on perfect phylogeny computations provided a comprehensive theory for the timing of the early subdivisions in the Indo-European languages. Their computations lent support to the Indo-Hittite hypothesis according to which the first of these subdivisions to separate from the rest of the Indo-European languages were the Anatolian languages. Their results also support the Graeco-Armenian hypothesis, according to which the Armenian language and Greek language form a subfamily of Indo-European. They fit the Germanic languages into the evolutionary tree of Indo-European languages, previously considered problematic, by hypothesizing that the Proto-Germanic language was closely related to the Balto-Slavic languages but then became modified by westward migrations of the Germanic tribes which led them into contact with Italic and Celtic speakers. This perfect phylogeny approach was later extended by Warnow and colleagues to allow for undetected borrowing between languages, so that language evolution is modelled with a network rather than a tree. In 2024, Warnow and colleagues Donald Ringe, Steven N. Evans, and Marc Canby, published work on modeling lexical polymorphism in languages, and used this to estimate a new Indo-European tree.

In 2009, Warnow and her colleagues released their SATé software for co-estimating biological multiple sequence alignments and evolutionary trees. Their software is based less strongly on firm mathematical principles than some previous co-estimation methods (such as BAli-Phy), but is significantly faster, allowing the fast construction of highly accurate trees and alignments for thousands of species. In comparison, the slow performance of previous methods limited them to only comparing dozens of species at a time.

Her computational biology work since 2014 has focused on three topics: scaling multiple sequence alignments to ultra-large datasets, species tree estimation using multiple genes (and addressing gene tree heterogeneity due to incomplete lineage sorting), and metagenomics. Her major contributions in these topics include the PASTA method for co-estimation of alignments and trees, which improves on SATé, and can produce highly accurate alignments with up to 1,000,000 sequences. She has also developed the ASTRAL method for species tree estimation, which is a statistically consistent method for constructing species trees in the presence of incomplete lineage sorting. Within microbiome analysis, Warnow has contributed the TIPP family of methods for abundance profiling and species detection, which operate using statistical learning and machine learning methods for remote homology detection, multiple sequence alignment, and phylogenetic placement. This work includes TIPP3, which was shown to provide improved accuracy for abundance profiling, and TIPP-SD, which showed improved accuracy for detecting species in microbiome samples.

=== Awards and honors ===
Warnow was named a Grainger Distinguished Chair in Engineering in 2020 and Founder Professor of Engineering in 2014 (both at UIUC), and the David Bruton Jr. Centennial Professorship in Computer Science at the University of Texas at Austin in 2010. Warnow also received a John Simon Guggenheim Foundation Fellowship in 2011, a Radcliffe Institute Fellowship in 2003, a David and Lucile Packard Foundation Fellowship in 1996, and the NSF Young Investigator Award in 1994. In 2015, she was named a Fellow of Association for Computing Machinery (ACM) "For contributions to mathematical theory, algorithms, and software for large-scale molecular phylogenetics and historical linguistics". In 2017, she was elected as a Fellow of the International Society for Computational Biology (ISCB). She was named to the 2021 class of Fellows of the American Association for the Advancement of Science. She received the ISCB Senior Scientist Award in 2024, and was elected Treasurer of the ISCB in 2025. She was elected a Member of the American Academy of Arts and Sciences in 2026..

== Personal life ==
Warnow's mother was noted archivist Joan Warnow-Blewett, and her father was Morton Warnow, the son of the band leader Mark Warnow and nephew of the composer Raymond Scott. Her twin sister is Kimmen Sjolander, a bioinformatics researcher and emeritus faculty member at the University of California, and her brother is Paul Warnow. She is married to George Chacko, a Research Associate Professor in Computer Science at UIUC's Grainger College of Engineering. Warnow has two children: daughters Kristin Kane and Menaka Sampath.
