= Karen Miga =

American genomics expert

Karen H. Miga
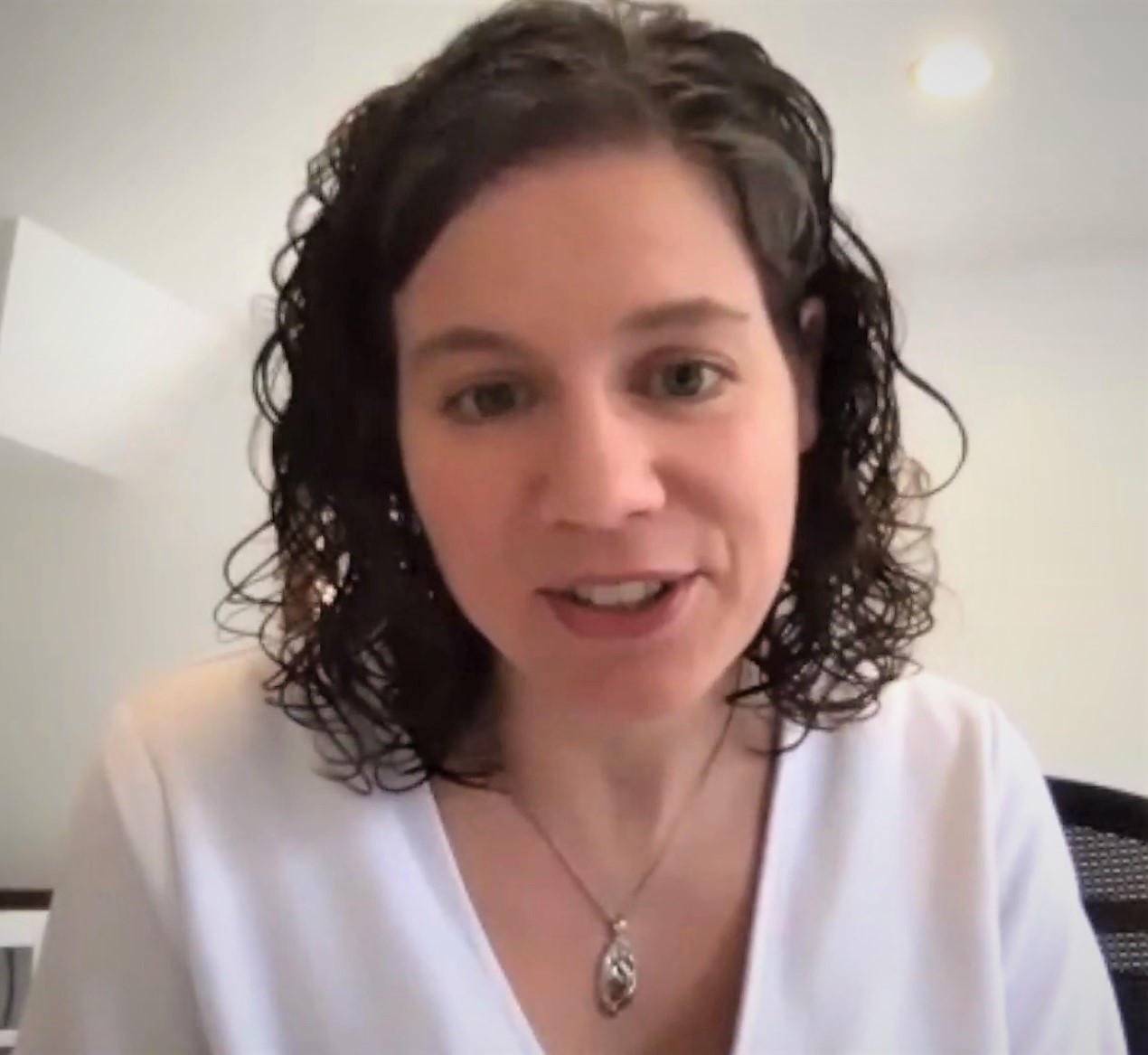
- Karen Miga at Bioinformatics Community Conference 2020
- Born: Karen Elizabeth Hayden
- Known for: Telomere to Telomere Project
- Scientific career
- Workplaces: University of California, Santa Cruz
- Thesis: A Genomic Definition of Centromeres in Complex Genomes (2011)
- Doctoral advisor: Huntington Willard
- Website: www.migalab.com

Karen Hayden Miga is an American geneticist who co-leads the Telomere-to-Telomore (T2T) consortium that released fully complete assembly of the human genome in March 2022. She is an associate professor of biomolecular engineering at the University of California, Santa Cruz and Associate Director of Human Pangenomics at the UC Santa Cruz Genomics Institute. She was named as "One to Watch" in the 2020 Nature's 10 and one of Time 100's most influential people of 2022.

== Research and career ==
In 2012, Miga joined the laboratory of David Haussler at the University of California, Santa Cruz. At UCSC she combined computational and experimental approaches. There she leads the telomere-to-telomere (T2T) consortium, a community based effort that seeks to fully sequence and assemble the human genome. Her research efforts make use of long-read sequencing strategies. She makes use of the Oxford Nanopore Technologies MinION sequencer, which analyses DNA by detecting changes in current flow when DNA passes through nanopores in a membrane.

Miga is the director of the Human Pangenome Production Center that seeks to contribute to the next human pangenome reference map through the creation of 350 T2T diploid genomes. This map will support the development of personalized therapeutics.

In 2022, Miga participated in the closing plenary session of the Clinton Global Initiative meeting, where she discussed the future of equitable genomics research with former President Bill Clinton, U2 lead singer Bono, and Director-General of the World Health Organization (WHO) Tedros Ghebreyesus. 2023, Karen Miga was named a 2023 Searle Scholar to study uncharted heterochromatin regions of the human genome.

== Selected publications ==
- Miga, Karen H.; Koren, Sergey; Rhie, Arang; Vollger, Mitchell R.; Gershman, Ariel; Bzikadze, Andrey; Brooks, Shelise; Howe, Edmund; Porubsky, David; Logsdon, Glennis A.; Schneider, Valerie A. (2020). "Telomere-to-telomere assembly of a complete human X chromosome". Nature. 585 (7823): 79–84. Bibcode:2020Natur.585...79M. doi:10.1038/s41586-020-2547-7. PMC 7484160. PMID 32663838.
- Chimpanzee Sequencing Analysis Consortium (2005). "Initial sequence of the chimpanzee genome and comparison with the human genome". Nature. 437 (7055): 69–87. Bibcode:2005Natur.437...69.. doi:10.1038/nature04072. ISSN 0028-0836. PMID 16136131.
- Rosenbloom, Kate R.; Armstrong, Joel; Barber, Galt P.; Casper, Jonathan; Clawson, Hiram; Diekhans, Mark; Dreszer, Timothy R.; Fujita, Pauline A.; Guruvadoo, Luvina; Haeussler, Maximilian; Harte, Rachel A. (2015-01-28). "The UCSC Genome Browser database: 2015 update". Nucleic Acids Research. 43 (D1): D670–D681. doi:10.1093/nar/gku1177. ISSN 0305-1048. PMC 4383971. PMID 25428374.
- Jain, Miten; Koren, Sergey; Miga, Karen H.; Quick, Josh; Rand, Arthur C.; Sasani, Thomas A.; Tyson, John R.; Beggs, Andrew D.; Dilthey, Alexander T.; Fiddes, Ian T.; Malla, Sunir (2018). "Nanopore sequencing and assembly of a human genome with ultra-long reads". Nature Biotechnology. 36 (4): 338–345. doi:10.1038/nbt.4060. ISSN 1546-1696. PMC 5889714. PMID 29431738.
