= Margo Goodhand =

Canadian journalist

- Born: Winnipeg
- Education: University of Winnipeg
- Occupation: Editor-in-Chief

Margo Goodhand is a Canadian journalist who served as the first female editor of the Winnipeg Free Press.

Goodhand was appointed in 2007 and resigned in 2012. She was the editor-in-chief of the Edmonton Journal from 2013 to 2016.
