= Anders Krogh =

- Education: University of Copenhagen
- Occupation: Professor
- Known for: hidden Markov models, neural networks
- Awards: ISCB Fellow (2017)
- Scientific career
- Fields: Bioinformatics
- Workplaces: University of Copenhagen
- Website: people.binf.ku.dk/krogh

Anders Krogh is a bioinformatician at the University of Copenhagen, where he leads the university's bioinformatics center. He is known for his pioneering work on the use of hidden Markov models in bioinformatics (together with David Haussler), and is co-author of a widely used textbook in bioinformatics. In addition, he also co-authored one of the early textbooks on neural networks. His current research interests include promoter analysis, non-coding RNA, gene prediction and protein structure prediction.

In 2017, Krogh was elected a Fellow of the International Society for Computational Biology (ISCB).

== See also ==
- ELIXIR
