= Sunnybrook Research Institute =

Canadian research centre

Sunnybrook Research Institute (SRI) is one of the largest research centres in Canada and is fully affiliated with the University of Toronto. The institute employs over 300 scientists and clinician-scientists and has a total of over 1300 research staff.

== Disciplines and Platforms ==
Each scientist at Sunnybrook Research Institute (SRI) belongs to a platform and a program.

=== Research Platforms ===
- Biological sciences
- Evaluative clinical sciences
- Physical sciences

=== Research programs ===
- Brain Sciences
- Cancer (Odette Cancer Centre)
- Heart (Schulich Heart Centre)
- Musculoskeletal (Holland Musculoskeletal Centre)
- St. John's Rehab Research
- Trauma, Emergency & Critical Care
- Veterans & Community
- Women & Babies

== Commercialization ==
Sunnybrook Research Institute has been issued a total of 64 patents and currently have 29 active licences. Several spinoff companies have emerged from SRI, including VisualSonics Inc., Sentinelle Medical Inc. and Profound Medical Inc.

== See also ==
- PolyAnalytik
