= Andrzej Ehrenfeucht =

Polish American computer scientist

- Born: August 8, 1932 (age 94); Wilno, Poland
- Education: University of Warsaw
- Known for: Ehrenfeucht–Fraïssé game Ehrenfeucht–Mycielski sequence
- Scientific career
- Fields: Mathematics
- Workplaces: University of Colorado at Boulder
- Doctoral advisor: Andrzej Mostowski
- Doctoral students: David Haussler; Eugene Myers

Andrzej Ehrenfeucht (Polish: [ˈand.ʐɛj ˈɛrɛnfɔjxt], born 8 August 1932) is a Polish-American mathematician and computer scientist.

== Life ==
Andrzej Ehrenfeucht formulated the Ehrenfeucht–Fraïssé game, using the back-and-forth method given in Roland Fraïssé's PhD thesis. Also named for Ehrenfeucht is the Ehrenfeucht–Mycielski sequence.

In 1971 Ehrenfeucht was a founding member of the Department of Computer Science at the University of Colorado at Boulder. He currently teaches and does research at the University, where he runs a project, "breaking away", with Patricia Baggett; the project, using hands-on activities, aims at raising high-school students' interest in mathematics and technology.

Two of Ehrenfeucht's students, Eugene Myers and David Haussler, contributed to the sequencing of the human genome. They, with Harold Gabow, Ross McConnell, and Grzegorz Rozenberg, spoke at a 2012 University of Colorado two-day symposium honoring Ehrenfeucht's 80th birthday.

Two journal issues have come out in his honor, one at his 65th birthday in Lecture Notes in Computer Science, and one at his 80th in Theoretical Computer Science.

=== Private life ===
Ehrenfeucht married Alfred Tarski's daughter Ina Tarski.

== Bibliography ==
=== Books ===
- Andrzej Ehrenfeucht, Tero Harju, Ion Petre, David M. Prescott, Grzegorz Rozenberg, Computation in Living Cells: Gene Assembly in Ciliates, Springer, 2004, ISBN 3-540-40795-2
- Patricia Baggett, Andrzej Ehrenfeucht, Breaking Away from the Math Book: Creative Projects for Grades K-6, ISBN 1-56676-299-5
- Andrzej Ehrenfeucht, Tero Harju, Grzegorz Rozenberg, The Theory of 2-Structures: A Framework for Decomposition and Transformation of Graphs, World Scientific, 1999, ISBN 981-02-4042-2

=== Papers ===
(accessible through Wirtualna Biblioteka Nauki)

- Chen Chung Chang, Andrzej Ehrenfeucht, "A Characterization of Abelian Groups", Fundamenta Mathematicae, vol. 51, no. 2, 1962, pp. 141–147.
- Andrzej Ehrenfeucht, "An Application of Games to the Completeness Problem for Formalized Theories", Fundamenta Mathematicae, vol. 49, no. 2, 1960, pp. 129–141.
- Andrzej Ehrenfeucht, "On Theories Categorical in Power", Fundamenta Mathematicae, vol. 44, no. 2, 1957, pp. 241–248.
- Andrzej Ehrenfeucht, Andrzej Mostowski, "Models of Axiomatic Theories Admitting Automorphisms", Fundamenta Mathematicae, 1956, vol. 43, no. 1, pp. 50–68.

== See also ==
- List of Poles – Mathematics
