= National Center for Genome Resources =

American non-profit research organization

National Center for Genome Resources (NCGR)
- Abbreviation: NCGR
- Formation: 1993
- Legal status: Private, nonprofit life sciences research institute
- Location: Santa Fe, New Mexico, U.S.
- Website: www.ncgr.org

The National Center for Genome Resources (NCGR) is a not-for-profit research institute that innovates, collaborates, and educates in the field of genomic data science.
