= Peter Goodhand =

Peter Goodhand is a senior executive and board member in the health research advancement community.

== Career ==
Starting in the UK in 1980 and moving to North America in 1986, Goodhand had a 20-year career in the global medical technology industry, including international leadership roles with American Cyanamid and Johnson & Johnson.

From 2000 to 2003 he served as the board chair and president of the Canadian Medical Device Technology Association (MEDEC) and presented MEDEC's submission to the Senate Standing Committee on Science and Technology in October 2001.

In 2003 he became the founding managing director of the Health Technology Exchange (HTX) and the chairman of the board in 2004.

In 2004 he joined the Ontario Division of the Canadian Cancer Society as its CEO and in 2009 became the national president and CEO.

In 2009 he chaired the Government of Canada’s Expert working group on the future of medical isotope production, and in September 2011 was a member of the Canadian delegation to the first UN High Level Meeting on non-communicable diseases.

From 2012 to 2013 Goodhand played a key role in the creation of a global alliance to accelerate progress in genomic research and medicine and in 2014 became the founding executive director of the Global Alliance for Genomics and Health (GA4GH).

As a volunteer he is currently chair of the board HTX; chair of the steering committee of the Occupational Cancer Research Center; Chair of the industry advisory committee and board member of the AGE-WELL National Centre of Excellence; Board Member, MaRS EXCITE (Excellence in Clinical Innovation and Technology Evaluation); and a member of the Scientific and Medical Advisory board of Global Genes - Allies in Rare Disease.

== Awards ==
2006, The Heather Crowe Award from the Ontario Government for leadership in advocacy in tobacco control.

2014, The Champions of Hope Award from Global Genes.

2015, The Outstanding Canadian Distinction Award from the Health Charities Coalition of Canada.
