= PolyAnalytik =

Canadian contract research organization

- Industry: Pharmaceuticals, biotechnology, materials science, biomedical, medical, bioprocessing, food and agriculture, electric batteries, petrochemicals.
- Founded: 2007; 19 years ago in Canada
- Founder: Amer Ebied
- Area served: Global
- Website: polyanalytik.com

PolyAnalytik Inc. is a Canadian contract research organization, based in London, Ontario, founded in 2007, headquartered at Western Research Parks, the company provides analytical services focused on polymers, biopolymers, and small molecules. It conducts studies and offers testing services relevant to sectors including pharmaceuticals, biotechnology, medical devices, food and agriculture, and environmental sciences.

== History ==
PolyAnalytik Inc. was founded in 2007 by Amer Ebied. The company's early work included gel permeation chromatography, and later incorporated additional techniques for polymer analysis.

The laboratory is accredited under ISO/IEC 17025:2015 by the American Association for Laboratory Accreditation (A2LA), which indicates adherence to recognized standards for quality management in laboratory operations.

In 2017, PolyAnalytik Inc. entered into a partnership with Tosoh Bioscience LLC to provide analytical support and services related to specific instrumentation, including the EcoSEC GPC Systems and TSKgel HPLC columns, in Canada and the United States. The scope of the agreement was expanded in 2022 to include regions in the Middle East and North Africa. Later, the company established an international presence with offices outside Canada.

In 2022, PolyAnalytik Inc. established a joint venture with Concorde Corodex Group, a long-standing environmental and water treatment company based in the United Arab Emirates, to form Corodex Life Sciences. The venture marked PolyAnalytik's expansion into the Middle East and the establishment of a dedicated contract research organization (CRO) in the region. Corodex Life Sciences provides advanced analytical and molecular testing services, supporting sectors such as pharmaceuticals, medical devices, environmental sciences, and water treatment. The initiative aims to strengthen regional research infrastructure by offering expertise in polymer characterization, the detection of emerging contaminants, and applied molecular research. The CRO has also contributed to ecological research, including biological approaches to lake management using native species. The collaboration reflects a shared commitment to advancing scientific research and innovation, while supporting sustainable development goals in the Middle East.

Additionally, Ahad Al-Hakim, associated with PolyAnalytik Inc., was appointed to the London Chamber of Commerce and Industry (LCCI) Board of Directors on September 19, 2024. This appointment followed a selection process that considered the Board Composition Report, Diversity Policy, and the Government of Canada's 50/30 Challenge.

In 2025, the company was invited to present at the Japan-Canada Joint Seminar "Smart Materials" & Networking Event held in Japan on January 27, 2025. This event aimed to promote interaction and collaboration between Canadian smart materials startups and Japanese companies and organizations, with more than 40,000 visitors.

== Inventors and Registered Patents ==
1- Methods for extracting and analyzing compounds from implanted and excised medical devices -US20220291096A1,

This patent describes a method to safely extract and analyze tiny amounts of polymers from medical devices, both in and out of the body. It helps track material breakdown and detect drug residues for safety and performance studies.

2- Synthetic method for the preparation of rheological modifying polymers and the use thereof, US20210317249A1. The Inventors are Joseph A. Paquette, Olabode O. Oyeneye, Eric D. Landry, and Amer Ebied. This invention covers a way to create special polymers that control how liquids flow. Using UV light to trigger a precise chemical reaction, the method produces materials useful in cosmetics, medicine, and more.

== Innovation Award ==
In 2019, PolyAnalytik Inc. received the Innovation Award from the London Chamber of Commerce's Business Achievement Awards. The recognition highlighted the company's effective use of technology to support its growth. The award positioned PolyAnalytik among leading businesses in London's technology and research sectors.

== Publications ==
- Detection of the Butyl Acrylate–Vinyl Acetate (BA–VA) Copolymer in Soil Binders Using Gel Permeation Chromatography (GPC) and Nuclear Magnetic Resonance (NMR).
- Supramolecular complexation of C60 with branched polyethylene.

Mentions in Publications - Announcements - part of Publications:

- Development of New Resolvin D1 Analogues for Osteoarthritis Therapy: Acellular and Computational Approaches to Study Their Antioxidant Activities.
- Characterization of Polyisobutylene SuccinicAnhydride (PIBSA) and Its PIBSI Products from the Reaction of PIBSA with Hexamethylene Diamine.
- Persistence Length of PEGMA Bottle BrushesDetermined by Pyrene Excimer Fluorescence.
- Rheological, Chemical and MicrostructuralCharacterization of Asphalt Binders Aged at Different Conditions and Evaluation of the Use of Antioxidants and Copolymers to Retard Aging.
- American Ginseng Modulation of ImmuneFunction and Phytochemical Analysis.
- Synthesis of Metal-Containing Phosphines and their use in Coordination, Polymer, and Materials Chemistry.
