= Learnability =

Learnability is the ease with which a system, concept, or skill can be acquired, whether by humans or machines. While there is no direct definition of learnability, Merriam-Webster dictionary has defined the definition of a similar concept of 'learnable' as “the degree to which knowledge or skill (in something) can be acquired through study or experience". In software development and product design field, learnability can also be described as a quality of products and interfaces that allows users to quickly become familiar with them and able to make good use of all their features and capabilities. While the term spans multiple disciplines, the focus vary across fields.

In human–computer interaction, learnability refers to how quickly and easily a person can acquire the skills to perform tasks, and interact with a product. The ability to quickly understand how to operate a product ties deeply with user experience, which aims to design an experience that is intuitive, easy to use, and has a low learning curve for the user. It is considered one dimension of usability, which ISO 9241-11:2018 defines as "the extent to which a system, product or service can be used by specified users to achieve specified goals with effectiveness, efficiency and satisfaction in a specified context of use." Within this framework, learnability focuses on "the ease with which a user can learn to operate, prepare inputs for, and interpret outputs of a system or component".

In education and cognitive science, learnability refers to the capability of individuals to acquire new knowledge, skills, or behaviors effectively and efficiently, This could be an acquisition of a new language, new subject areas, or desired social behaviors. In addition, learnability can also be described as the capacity to be a self-driven, life-long learner, and the willingness to evolve along with the changing world. This skill of learnability is becoming increasingly important in the workplace as one of the desired attributes in employees.

In Machine learning, learnability describes the extent to which an algorithm can improve its performance, typically measured by its ability to generalize from training data to unseen data to perform tasks. Unlike human learning, it is based on statistical pattern recognition and is driven by large-scale data processing and parameter optimization rather than lived experience, socioeconomic status, or environmental influences, etc. In software testing learnability, according to ISO/IEC 9126, is the capability of a software product to enable the user to learn how to use it. Learnability may be considered as an aspect of usability, and is of major concern in the design of complex software applications.

== Computational learning theory ==
In computational learning theory, learnability is the mathematical analysis of machine learning. It is also employed in language acquisition in arguments within linguistics.

Frameworks include:

- Language identification in the limit proposed in 1967 by E. Mark Gold. Subsequently known as Algorithmic learning theory.
- Probably approximately correct learning (PAC learning) proposed in 1984 by Leslie Valiant

== Influencing factors on learnability ==
Learnability is influenced by multiple interacting factors such as:

=== Cognitive factors ===
The limits of human working memory have a significant impact on how we learn. Miller’s seminal work suggested that working memory can hold about seven, plus or minus two, chunks of information, while later research by Cowan proposed a more accurate limit of three to five chunks. This means we cannot process large amounts of information all at once; instead, breaking it into smaller chunks helps us manage the constraints of working memory. In a study examining how chunking supports working memory, they found compelling evidence that "chunking benefits were found not only for recall of the chunked but also of other not‑chunked information concurrently held in working memory, supporting the assumption that chunking reduces load." To put it simply, chunking reduces the load on working memory by grouping information into more manageable units. These insights are valuable for designing effective ways of presenting information, particularly by organizing content into meaningful, manageable units.

Furthermore, the concept from Schema theory also influences how we understand the way information gets sorted, recalled, and used. According to the schema theory, we used our prior knowledge in understanding and associating the information that was presented to us. We make sense of what happens by recalling past experiences to interpret and guide how we solve problems. The richer our knowledge base is, the faster we can learnThis influences learnability. The “Baseball Study” by Recht & Leslie shows that students with more background knowledge about baseball comprehended and recalled a baseball-themed passage much better, even outperforming more skilled readers who lacked that background.

=== Motivation and emotions ===
Motivation and emotion also play a critical role in influencing the ability to learn for individuals. Motivation directs behavior and influences persistence. For example, intrinsic motivation (e.g., curiosity, sense of purpose) linked to deeper engagement and long-term learning, while extrinsic motivation can boost performance but may not sustain learning. Emotions modulate attention, memory, and problem-solving. Positive emotions (e.g., enjoyment, pride) enhance self-regulation and learning strategies, whereas negative emotions (e.g., anxiety, boredom) may impair these processes, though mild anxiety can sometimes heighten extrinsic motivation to avoid failure.

=== Biological progression ===
Biological progression also shape learning ability, particularly age-related changes in cognitive processing, sensory function, and motivation. For example, fluid intelligence follows a biological progression, typically peaking in early adulthood and gradually declining with age, while crystallized intelligence progresses differently, increasing through midlife and remaining stable into later adulthood.

Several additional cognitive and sensory changes influence learning:

- Working memory capacity declines gradually after midlife, reducing the ability to juggle multiple new ideas at once.
- Processing speed slows with age, requiring more time to absorb and respond to new information.
- Attention control shifts: selective attention remains relatively stable, but divided attention and executive control often decline.
- Sensory acuity in vision and hearing decreases over time, which can reduce the clarity of input (Schneider & Pichora-Fuller, 2000).
- Neuroplasticity persists into older adulthood but at a reduced rate, meaning that new skills often require more repetition and practice to master.

Despite these changes, older adults often excel in knowledge-rich tasks. Preserved or enhanced semantic memory and crystallized intelligence allow them to perform well in domains such as vocabulary and general knowledge.

They are particularly successful when learning tasks:

- Leverage prior knowledge to connect new material to existing frameworks.
- Use supportive instructional design such as step-by-step explanations, worked examples, and practice activities.
- Provide positive feedback and mindset cues that strengthen self-efficacy.
- Offer optimized environments with autonomy, external attentional focus, and opportunities for social learning.
