= Finite thickness =

In formal language theory, in particular in algorithmic learning theory, a class C of languages has finite thickness if every string is contained in at most finitely many languages in C. This condition was introduced by Dana Angluin as a sufficient condition for C being identifiable in the limit.

== The related notion of M-finite thickness ==
Given a language L and an indexed class C = { L_{1}, L_{2}, L_{3}, ... } of languages, a member language L_{j} ∈ C is called a minimal concept of L within C if L ⊆ L_{j}, but not L ⊊ L_{i} ⊆ L_{j} for any L_{i} ∈ C. The class C is said to satisfy the MEF-condition if every finite subset D of a member language L_{i} ∈ C has a minimal concept L_{j} ⊆ L_{i}. Symmetrically, C is said to satisfy the MFF-condition if every nonempty finite set D has at most finitely many minimal concepts in C. Finally, C is said to have M-finite thickness if it satisfies both the MEF- and the MFF-condition.

Finite thickness implies M-finite thickness. However, there are classes that are of M-finite thickness but not of finite thickness (for example, any class of languages C = { L_{1}, L_{2}, L_{3}, ... } such that L_{1} ⊆ L_{2} ⊆ L_{3} ⊆ ...).
