= Sample exclusion dimension =

In computational learning theory, sample exclusion dimensions arise in the study of exact concept learning with queries.

In algorithmic learning theory, a concept over a domain X is a Boolean function over X. Here we only consider finite domains. A partial approximation S of a concept c is a Boolean function over $Y\subseteq X$ such that c is an extension to S.

Let C be a class of concepts and c be a concept (not necessarily in C). Then a specifying set for c w.r.t. C, denoted by S is a partial approximation S of c such that C contains at most one extension to S. If we have observed a specifying set for some concept w.r.t. C, then we have enough information to verify a concept in C with at most one more mind change.

The exclusion dimension, denoted by XD(C), of a concept class is the maximum of the size of the minimum specifying set of c' with respect to C, where c' is a concept not in C.
