= Pattern language (disambiguation) =

Pattern language is a structured method of documenting good design practices in architecture, software engineering, and other design disciplines.

Pattern language may also refer to:

- A Pattern Language, a famous book written by Christopher Alexander on design patterns in architecture, which established the concept pattern language (see above)
- Pattern language (formal languages), a class of strings generated from a pattern by substitutions, in formal language theory and machine learning
