= I&C =

I&C may refer to:

- Information and Computation (Journal)
- Information and communication technology
- Industrial and commercial
- Instrumentation and control
- Information and Control (Journal)
- Installation and commissioning
- Installation and checkout
- Implementation and compliance
- Issues and criteria
- Instrumentation and communications
