= Jian Xin Xu =

Chinese-born Singaporean professor (1958–2018)

Jian Xin Xu (许建新) was a Chinese-born Singaporean professor at the National University of Singapore (NUS) Department of Electrical and Computer Engineering. His research interests included robotics, learning theory, and control theory.

Xu received his bachelor's degree in electrical engineering from Zhejiang University in 1982, and then moved to Japan where he completed his master's (1986) and Ph.D. (1989) at the University of Tokyo in the same field. Following that, he worked for Hitachi Research Laboratories for a year, and was then a visiting research fellow at Ohio University and a visiting scholar at Yale University, before joining the NUS faculty in 1991. He was named Fellow of the Institute of Electrical and Electronics Engineers (IEEE) in 2012 "for contributions to motion control systems".

Professor Xu died at the age of 61 on February 7, 2018 after fighting a serious illness for over seven years.
