= Concept class =

Computational learning theory

In computational learning theory in mathematics, a concept over a domain X is a total Boolean function over X. A concept class is a class of concepts. Concept classes are a subject of computational learning theory.

Concept class terminology frequently appears in model theory associated with probably approximately correct (PAC) learning. In this setting, if one takes a set Y as a set of (classifier output) labels, and X is a set of examples, the map $c: X\to Y$, i.e. from examples to classifier labels (where $Y = \{0, 1\}$ and where c is a subset of X), c is then said to be a concept. A concept class $C$ is then a collection of such concepts.

Given a class of concepts C, a subclass D is reachable if there exists a sample s such that D contains exactly those concepts in C that are extensions to s. Not every subclass is reachable.

== Background ==
A sample $s$ is a partial function from $X$ to $\{0, 1\}$. Identifying a concept with its characteristic function mapping $X$ to $\{0, 1\}$, it is a special case of a sample.

Two samples are consistent if they agree on the intersection of their domains. A sample $s'$ extends another sample $s$ if the two are consistent and the domain of $s$ is contained in the domain of $s'$.

== Examples ==
Suppose that $C = S^+(X)$. Then:

- the subclass $\{\{x\}\}$ is reachable with the sample $s = \{(x, 1)\}$;
- the subclass $S^+(Y)$ for $Y\subseteq X$ are reachable with a sample that maps the elements of $X - Y$ to zero;
- the subclass $S(X)$, which consists of the singleton sets, is not reachable.

== Applications ==
Let $C$ be some concept class. For any concept $c\in C$, we call this concept $1/d$-good for a positive integer $d$ if, for all $x\in X$, at least $1/d$ of the concepts in $C$ agree with $c$ on the classification of $x$. The fingerprint dimension $FD(C)$ of the entire concept class $C$ is the least positive integer $d$ such that every reachable subclass $C'\subseteq C$ contains a concept that is $1/d$-good for it. This quantity can be used to bound the minimum number of equivalence queries needed to learn a class of concepts according to the following inequality:$FD(C) - 1\leq \#EQ(C)\leq \lceil FD(C)\ln(|C|)\rceil$.
