= Information and Computation =

- Discipline: Computer Science
- Language: English
- Edited by: Albert R. Meyer

Publication details
- Former names: Information and Control
- History: 1957–present
- Publisher: Elsevier (USA)
- Frequency: monthly
- Open access: no
- Impact factor: 1.24 (2021)

Standard abbreviations
- ISO 4: Inf. Comput.
- MathSciNet: Inform. and Comput.

Indexing
- ISSN: 0890-5401

Links
- Journal homepage; online access

Information and Computation is a closed-access computer science journal published by Elsevier (formerly Academic Press). The journal was founded in 1957 under its former name Information and Control and given its current title in 1987. As of July 2022, the current editor-in-chief is David Peleg. The journal publishes 12 issues a year.

== History ==
Information and Computation was founded as Information and Control in 1957 at the initiative of Leon Brillouin and under the editorship of Leon Brillouin, Colin Cherry and Peter Elias. Murray Eden joined as editor in 1962 and became sole editor-in-chief in 1967. He was succeeded by Albert R. Meyer in 1981, under whose editorship the journal was rebranded Information and Computation in 1987 in response to the shifted focus of the journal towards theory of computation and away from control theory. In 2020, Albert Mayer was succeeded by David Peleg as editor-in-chief of the journal.

== Indexing ==
All articles from the Information and Computation journal can be viewed on indexing services like Scopus and Science Citation Index. They are also reviewed cover-to-cover by the AMS Mathematical Reviews and zbMATH and included in the computer science database DBLP. According to the Journal Citation Reports, Information and Computation has a 2021 impact factor of 1.24.

== Landmark publications ==
=== On certain formal properties of grammars ===
- Chomsky, N. (1959). "On certain formal properties of grammars". Information and Control. 2 (2): 137–167. doi:10.1016/S0019-9958(59)90362-6.

Description: This article introduced what is now known as the Chomsky hierarchy, a containment hierarchy of classes of formal grammars that generate formal languages.

=== A formal theory of inductive inference ===
- Solomonoff, R.J. (1964). "A formal theory of inductive inference. Part II". Information and Control. 7 (2): 224–254. doi:10.1016/s0019-9958(64)90131-7. ISSN 0019-9958.

Description: This was the beginning of algorithmic information theory and Kolmogorov complexity. Note that though Kolmogorov complexity is named after Andrey Kolmogorov, he said that the seeds of that idea are due to Ray Solomonoff. Andrey Kolmogorov contributed a lot to this area but in later articles.

=== Fuzzy sets ===
- Zadeh, L.A. (1965). "Fuzzy sets". Information and Control. 8 (3): 338–353. doi:10.1016/s0019-9958(65)90241-x. ISSN 0019-9958.

Description: The seminal paper published in 1965 provides details on the mathematics of fuzzy set theory. As of July 2022, it is the most cited paper published in the journal.

=== On the translation of languages from left to right ===
- Knuth, D. E. (July 1965). "On the translation of languages from left to right". Information and Control. 8 (6): 607–639. doi:10.1016/S0019-9958(65)90426-2.

Description: LR parser, which does bottom up parsing for deterministic context-free languages. Later derived parsers, such as the LALR parser, have been and continue to be standard practice, such as in Yacc and descendants.

=== Language identification in the limit ===
- Gold, E Mark (1967). "Language identification in the limit". Information and Control. 10 (5): 447–474. doi:10.1016/s0019-9958(67)91165-5. ISSN 0019-9958.

Description: This paper created algorithmic learning theory. As of July 2022, it is the second most cited paper published in the journal.

=== A Calculus of Mobile Processes, I ===
- Milner, Robin; Parrow, Joachim; Walker, David (1992-09-01). "A calculus of mobile processes, I". Information and Computation. 100 (1): 1–40. doi:10.1016/0890-5401(92)90008-4. hdl:20.500.11820/cdd6d766-14a5-4c3e-8956-a9792bb2c6d3. ISSN 0890-5401.

Description: This paper first introduced the π-calculus. As of July 2022, it is the third most cited paper published in the journal and the most cited paper published since the journal assumed its current name.
