= Population protocol =

Distributed computing model

A population protocol is a distributed computing model formed by resource-limited mobile agents which meet in a random way according to an interaction graph. Functions are computed by updating the state of agents whenever they meet based on their previous state, and the result of the computation can be read in the states of the agents once the computation has converged.

== Model ==
There is a set $N = \{1, 2, \ldots, n\}$ of nodes. Each node is a finite automaton with $s$ states. An important class of population protocols are majority algorithms, where the goal is to compute the majority bit: each node starts with a belief bit in $\{0,1\}$and the goal is to design a protocol at the end of which the belief bit of every node is the correct initial majority bit.

The discrete time version of the model is as follows: at each point $t=1,2,\ldots$in time, some node $i$ is selected uniformly at random. Then the node is matched with another node $j$, which is chosen uniformly at random from the set of neighbors of node $i$. Afterwards, nodes $i$ and $j$ exchange memory contents and update their states. Alternatively, one can consider a continuous time model where each node $i$ has a Poisson clock that rings at unit rate. When the clock of a node rings, that node communicates with a random neighbor.

Protocols are often designed to minimize the convergence time or the amount of memory required per node or both.

== Three state protocol ==
For the problem of computing the majority (consensus), there is a well-known protocol that requires only three memory states per node and has been analyzed for complete interaction graphs. This protocol works as follows. Let each node $i$ initialize its memory state to their initial belief bit $b_i \in \{0,1\}.$ At each point in time, when two nodes communicate, they update their state according to the following table. The row labels give the initiator's state and the column labels the responder's state.

Interaction rules of 3-state protocol
	0	?	1
0	(0,0)	(0,0)	(0,?)
?	(?,0)	(?,?)	(?,1)
1	(1,?)	(1,1)	(1,1)

In words, if a node with belief $0$ gets matched with a node with belief $0$, then both nodes keep their belief; the update is similar if both beliefs are $1$ or both are $?$. However, if the initiator's belief is $0$ and the responder's belief is $?$, then the respondent updates their belief to $0$. If on the other hand the initiator has belief $0$ and the responder has belief $1$, then the responder changes their belief to $?$. Note that this protocol is one-way: every interaction changes at most the responder's state; thus it can be implemented with one-way communication.

Angluin, Aspnes, and Eisenstat showed that, from any initial configuration that does not consist of all "$?$"s, the three-state approximate majority protocol converges to either all nodes having belief $0$ or all nodes having belief $1$ within $O(n \cdot \log n)$ interactions with high probability. Additionally, the value chosen will be the majority non-"$?$" initial value, provided it exceeds the minority by a sufficient margin.

The following picture shows the evolution of the three state protocol on a set of $n=500$ nodes, where one third of the nodes have initial belief bit $0$, while the remaining two thirds have initial belief bit $1$. The fraction of "$?$" nodes (in orange) starts at zero, increases for a while, and then goes again to zero.

The three-state protocol solves the approximate majority problem, in which the correct answer is reached only with high probability and only when the initial imbalance is large enough. A harder variant is exact majority, where the population must stabilize on the true majority value with probability 1 regardless of how small the initial bias is. On complete interaction graphs, exact majority exhibits space–time trade-offs: any constant-state protocol is comparatively slow, while protocols using Θ(log n) states can stabilize in the asymptotically optimal Θ(n log n) time. A simple four-state protocol solves exact majority on any connected interaction graph, not only complete ones. For general graphs, the time and space complexity of exact majority can be analyzed in terms of the relaxation time of the random walk induced by the scheduler and the graph's degree imbalance; on regular expander graphs this yields protocols matching the Θ(log n)-state, near-optimal-time performance known for complete graphs.

== History ==
Population protocols were introduced by Dana Angluin et al. as one of the first models of computation to be fully decentralized and to involve agents with highly limited resources, e.g., those found in sensor networks. Since then, this abstract computation model found applications in robotics and chemistry.

== See also ==
Swarm Intelligence
