= Quotient automaton =

In computer science, in particular in formal language theory, a quotient automaton can be obtained from a given nondeterministic finite automaton by joining some of its states. The quotient recognizes a superset of the given automaton; in some cases, handled by the Myhill–Nerode theorem, both languages are equal.

== Formal definition ==
A (nondeterministic) finite automaton is a quintuple A = ⟨Σ, S, s_{0}, δ, S_{f}⟩, where:

- Σ is the input alphabet (a finite, non-empty set of symbols),
- S is a finite, non-empty set of states,
- s_{0} is the initial state, an element of S,
- δ is the state-transition relation: δ ⊆ S × Σ × S, and
- S_{f} is the set of final states, a (possibly empty) subset of S. (Note: Hopcroft and Ullman (sect.2.3, p.20) use a slightly deviating definition of δ, viz. as a function from S × Σ to the power set of S.)

A string a_{1}...a_{n} ∈ Σ^{*} is recognized by A if there exist states s_{1}, ..., s_{n} ∈ S such that ⟨s_{i-1},a_{i},s_{i}⟩ ∈ δ for i=1,...,n, and s_{n} ∈ S_{f}. The set of all strings recognized by A is called the language recognized by A; it is denoted as L(A).

For an equivalence relation ≈ on the set S of A’s states, the quotient automaton A/_{≈} = ⟨Σ, S/_{≈}, [s_{0}], δ/_{≈}, S_{f}/_{≈}⟩ is defined by

- the input alphabet Σ being the same as that of A,
- the state set S/_{≈} being the set of all equivalence classes of states from S,
- the start state [s_{0}] being the equivalence class of A’s start state,
- the state-transition relation δ/_{≈} being defined by δ/_{≈}([s],a,[t]) if δ(s,a,t) for some s ∈ [s] and t ∈ [t], and
- the set of final states S_{f}/_{≈} being the set of all equivalence classes of final states from S_{f}.

The process of computing A/_{≈} is also called factoring A by ≈.

== Example ==
Quotient examples
	Automaton diagram	Recognized language	Is the quotient of		
	Automaton diagram	Recognized language	A by	B by	C by
A:		1+10+100			
B:		1^{*}+1^{*}0+1^{*}00	a≈b		
C:		1^{*}0^{*}	a≈b, c≈d	c≈d	
D:		(0+1)^{*}	a≈b≈c≈d	a≈c≈d	a≈c

For example, the automaton A shown in the first row of the table (Note: In the automaton diagrams in the table, symbols from the input alphabet and state names are colored in green and red, respectively; final states are drawn as double circles.) is formally defined by

- Σ^{A} = {0,1},
- S^{A} = {a,b,c,d},
- s^{A}_{0} = a,
- δ^{A} = { ⟨a,1,b⟩, ⟨b,0,c⟩, ⟨c,0,d⟩ }, and
- S^{A}_{f} = { b,c,d }.

It recognizes the finite set of strings { 1, 10, 100 }; this set can also be denoted by the regular expression "1+10+100".

The relation (≈) = { ⟨a,a⟩, ⟨a,b⟩, ⟨b,a⟩, ⟨b,b⟩, ⟨c,c⟩, ⟨c,d⟩, ⟨d,c⟩, ⟨d,d⟩ }, more briefly denoted as a≈b,c≈d, is an equivalence relation on the set {a,b,c,d} of automaton A’s states. Building the quotient of A by that relation results in automaton C in the third table row; it is formally defined by

- Σ^{C} = {0,1},
- S^{C} = {a,c}, (Note: Strictly formal, the set is S^{C} = { [a], [b], [c], [d] } = { [a], [c] }. The class brackets are omitted for readability.)
- s^{C}_{0} = a,
- δ^{C} = { ⟨a,1,a⟩, ⟨a,0,c⟩, ⟨c,0,c⟩ }, and
- S^{C}_{f} = { a,c }.

It recognizes the finite set of all strings composed of arbitrarily many 1s, followed by arbitrarily many 0s, i.e. { ε, 1, 10, 100, 1000, ..., 11, 110, 1100, 11000, ..., 111, ... }; this set can also be denoted by the regular expression "1^{*}0^{*}". Informally, C can be thought of resulting from A by glueing state a onto state b, and glueing state c onto state d.

The table shows some more quotient relations, such as B = A/_{a≈b}, and D = C/_{a≈c}.

== Properties ==
- For every automaton A and every equivalence relation ≈ on its states set, L(A/_{≈}) is a superset of (or equal to) L(A).
- Given a finite automaton A over some alphabet Σ, an equivalence relation ≈ can be defined on Σ^{*} by x ≈ y if ∀ z ∈ Σ^{*}: xz ∈ L(A) ↔ yz ∈ L(A). By the Myhill–Nerode theorem, A/_{≈} is a deterministic automaton that recognizes the same language as A. As a consequence, the quotient of A by every refinement of ≈ also recognizes the same language as A.

== See also ==
- Quotient group
- Quotient category
