= Error tolerance (PAC learning) =

In PAC learning, error tolerance refers to the ability of an algorithm to learn when the examples received have been corrupted in some way. In fact, this is a very common and important issue since in many applications it is not possible to access noise-free data. Noise can interfere with the learning process at different levels: the algorithm may receive data that have been occasionally mislabeled, or the inputs may have some false information, or the classification of the examples may have been maliciously adulterated.

== Notation and the Valiant learning model ==
In the following, let $X$ be our $n$-dimensional input space. Let $\mathcal{H}$ be a class of functions that we wish to use in order to learn a $\{0,1\}$-valued target function $f$ defined over $X$. Let $\mathcal{D}$ be the distribution of the inputs over $X$. The goal of a learning algorithm $\mathcal{A}$ is to choose the best function $h \in \mathcal{H}$ such that it minimizes $error(h) = P_{x \sim \mathcal{D} }( h(x) \neq f(x))$. Let us suppose we have a function $size(f)$ that can measure the complexity of $f$. Let $\text{Oracle}(x)$ be an oracle that, whenever called, returns an example $x$ and its correct label $f(x)$.

When no noise corrupts the data, we can define learning in the Valiant setting:

Definition: We say that $f$ is efficiently learnable using $\mathcal{H}$ in the Valiant setting if there exists a learning algorithm $\mathcal{A}$ that has access to $\text{Oracle}(x)$ and a polynomial $p(\cdot,\cdot,\cdot,\cdot)$ such that for any $0 < \varepsilon \leq 1$ and $0 < \delta \leq 1$ it outputs, in a number of calls to the oracle bounded by $p\left(\frac{1}{\varepsilon},\frac{1}{\delta},n,\text{size}(f)\right)$ , a function $h \in \mathcal{H}$ that satisfies with probability at least $1-\delta$ the condition $\text{error}(h) \leq \varepsilon$.

In the following we will define learnability of $f$ when data have suffered some modification.

== Classification noise ==
In the classification noise model a noise rate $0 \leq \eta < \frac{1}{2}$ is introduced. Then, instead of $\text{Oracle}(x)$ that returns always the correct label of example $x$, algorithm $\mathcal{A}$ can only call a faulty oracle $\text{Oracle}(x,\eta)$ that will flip the label of $x$ with probability $\eta$. As in the Valiant case, the goal of a learning algorithm $\mathcal{A}$ is to choose the best function $h \in \mathcal{H}$ such that it minimizes $error(h) = P_{x \sim \mathcal{D} }( h(x) \neq f(x))$. In applications it is difficult to have access to the real value of $\eta$, but we assume we have access to its upperbound $\eta_B$. Note that if we allow the noise rate to be $1/2$, then learning becomes impossible in any amount of computation time, because every label conveys no information about the target function.

Definition: We say that $f$ is efficiently learnable using $\mathcal{H}$ in the classification noise model if there exists a learning algorithm $\mathcal{A}$ that has access to $\text{Oracle}(x,\eta)$ and a polynomial $p(\cdot,\cdot,\cdot,\cdot)$ such that for any $0 \leq \eta \leq \frac{1}{2}$, $0\leq \varepsilon \leq 1$ and $0\leq \delta \leq 1$ it outputs, in a number of calls to the oracle bounded by $p\left(\frac{1}{1-2\eta_B}, \frac{1}{\varepsilon},\frac{1}{\delta},n,size(f)\right)$ , a function $h \in \mathcal{H}$ that satisfies with probability at least $1-\delta$ the condition $error(h) \leq \varepsilon$.

== Statistical query learning ==
Statistical Query Learning is a kind of active learning problem in which the learning algorithm $\mathcal{A}$ can decide if to request information about the likelihood $P_{f(x)}$ that a function $f$ correctly labels example $x$, and receives an answer accurate within a tolerance $\alpha$. Formally, whenever the learning algorithm $\mathcal{A}$ calls the oracle $\text{Oracle}(x,\alpha)$, it receives as feedback probability $Q_{f(x)}$, such that $Q_{f(x)} - \alpha \leq P_{f(x)} \leq Q_{f(x)} + \alpha$.

Definition: We say that $f$ is efficiently learnable using $\mathcal{H}$ in the statistical query learning model if there exists a learning algorithm $\mathcal{A}$ that has access to $\text{Oracle}(x,\alpha)$ and polynomials $p(\cdot,\cdot,\cdot)$, $q(\cdot,\cdot,\cdot)$, and $r(\cdot,\cdot,\cdot)$ such that for any $0 < \varepsilon \leq 1$ the following hold:

1. $\text{Oracle}(x,\alpha)$ can evaluate $P_{f(x)}$ in time $q\left(\frac{1}{\varepsilon},n,size(f)\right)$;
2. $\frac{1}{\alpha}$ is bounded by $r\left(\frac{1}{\varepsilon},n,size(f)\right)$
3. $\mathcal{A}$ outputs a model $h$ such that $err(h)<\varepsilon$, in a number of calls to the oracle bounded by $p\left(\frac{1}{\varepsilon},n,size(f)\right)$.

Note that the confidence parameter $\delta$ does not appear in the definition of learning. This is because the main purpose of $\delta$ is to allow the learning algorithm a small probability of failure due to an unrepresentative sample. Since now $\text{Oracle}(x,\alpha)$ always guarantees to meet the approximation criterion $Q_{f(x)} - \alpha \leq P_{f(x)} \leq Q_{f(x)} + \alpha$, the failure probability is no longer needed.

The statistical query model is strictly weaker than the PAC model: any efficiently SQ-learnable class is efficiently PAC learnable in the presence of classification noise, but there exist efficient PAC-learnable problems such as parity that are not efficiently SQ-learnable.

== Malicious classification ==
In the malicious classification model an adversary generates errors to foil the learning algorithm. This setting describes situations of error burst, which may occur when for a limited time transmission equipment malfunctions repeatedly. Formally, algorithm $\mathcal{A}$ calls an oracle $\text{Oracle}(x,\beta)$ that returns a correctly labeled example $x$ drawn, as usual, from distribution $\mathcal{D}$ over the input space with probability $1- \beta$, but it returns with probability $\beta$ an example drawn from a distribution that is not related to $\mathcal{D}$. Moreover, this maliciously chosen example may strategically selected by an adversary who has knowledge of $f$, $\beta$, $\mathcal{D}$, or the current progress of the learning algorithm.

Definition: Given a bound $\beta_B< \frac{1}{2}$ for $0 \leq \beta < \frac{1}{2}$, we say that $f$ is efficiently learnable using $\mathcal{H}$ in the malicious classification model, if there exist a learning algorithm $\mathcal{A}$ that has access to $\text{Oracle}(x,\beta)$ and a polynomial $p(\cdot,\cdot,\cdot,\cdot,\cdot)$ such that for any $0 < \varepsilon \leq 1$, $0 < \delta \leq 1$ it outputs, in a number of calls to the oracle bounded by $p\left(\frac{1}{1/2 - \beta_B},\frac{1}{\varepsilon},\frac{1}{\delta},n,size(f)\right)$ , a function $h \in \mathcal{H}$ that satisfies with probability at least $1-\delta$ the condition $error(h) \leq \varepsilon$.

== Errors in the inputs: nonuniform random attribute noise ==
In the nonuniform random attribute noise model the algorithm is learning a Boolean function, a malicious oracle $\text{Oracle}(x,\nu)$ may flip each $i$-th bit of example $x=(x_1,x_2,\ldots,x_n)$ independently with probability $\nu_i \leq \nu$.

This type of error can irreparably foil the algorithm, in fact the following theorem holds:

In the nonuniform random attribute noise setting, an algorithm $\mathcal{A}$ can output a function $h \in \mathcal{H}$ such that $error(h)<\varepsilon$ only if $\nu < 2\varepsilon$.

== See also ==
- Machine learning
- Data mining
- Probably approximately correct learning
- Adversarial machine learning
