= E. Mark Gold =

American physicist, mathematician, and computer scientist

E. Mark Gold (often written "E Mark Gold" without a dot, born 1936 in Los Angeles) is an American physicist, mathematician, and computer scientist. He became well known for his article Language identification in the limit which pioneered a formal model for inductive inference of formal languages, mainly by computers. Since 1999, an award of the conference on algorithmic learning theory is named after him.

== Academic education ==
In 1956, he got a B.S. in mathematics from the California Institute of Technology, in 1958, he got a M.S. in physics from Princeton University. In Jan 1965, got his Ph.D. from UCLA, supervised by Abraham Robinson.

== Scientific career ==
Gold's most influential contribution is the "Language Identification in the Limit" framework, often referred to as Gold's Theorem. This work established the mathematical foundations for how a computational system can learn a formal language from a sequence of examples. He demonstrated that while certain classes of languages (like regular languages) are identifiable in the limit, others, such as the class of all context-free languages, are not learnable from positive examples alone. This discovery had a profound impact on computational linguistics and artificial intelligence.

In 1962 and 1963, he worked at Unified Science Associates, Pasadena, on physics problems. About in 1963, he turned to mathematics, working for Lear Siegler, the RAND Corporation, Stanford University, the Institute for Formal Studies, Los Angeles, and the Oregon Research Institute. About in 1973, he moved to Montreal University and about 1977 to University of Rochester. In 1991, he published from Oakland.
